= Bacteriophage AP205 =

Virus classification
- (unranked): Virus
- Realm: Riboviria
- Kingdom: Orthornavirae
- Phylum: Lenarviricota
- Class: Leviviricetes
- Order: Norzivirales
- Family: Duinviridae
- Genus: Apeevirus
- Species: Apeevirus quebecense
- Virus: Acinetobacter phage AP205

Bacteriophage AP205 is a plaque-forming bacteriophage that infects Acinetobacter bacteria. Bacteriophage AP205 is a protein-coated virus with a positive single-stranded RNA genome. It is a member of the family Duinviridae from the class Leviviricetes, consisting of particles that infect Gram-negative bacteria such as E. coli.

AP205 was isolated from the gram negative species Acinetobacter. Sewage from Quebec, Canada was scanned for bacteriophages that replicated in Acinetobacter bacteria. AP205 was isolated by enrichment methods from urine by P. J. M. Bouvet. The virus was attached to a pili of Acinetobacter. Using electron microscopy, researchers were able to describe the physical characteristics of AP205.

== Structure ==
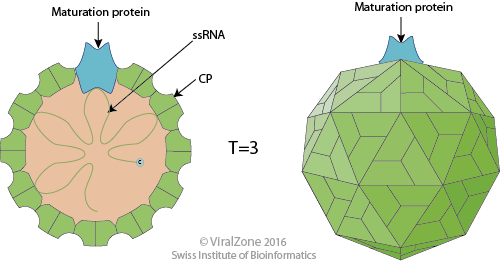
Structure of an ssRNA bacteriophage

The main structural component of Bacteriophage AP205 in the Leviviricetes class is a protein shell. Viruses in this family are not enveloped and are characterized by their icosahedral and spherical shape. The icosahedron shape of the capsid results from the arrangement of 178 copies of the coat protein which provide the virus with its structure. While the virus is icosahedral, the surface protrusions are smoother and less prominent of other viruses, giving the capsid a spherical appearance. The coat proteins form dimeric interactions due to hydrophobic and polar interactions to provide the capsid with a high level of structural rigidity. Before forming these dimers, the coat protein exists in three monomeric conformations, labeled A, B, and C. The A and C subunits of the capsid are folded in an arrangement such that they form a three-fold axis while the B subunit is arranged to form a five-fold axis . The protein shell also includes a single copy of a maturation protein (A protein) that functions in maturation of the virus and pilus attachment in prokaryotes. The virus-like particle (VLP) formation without the maturation protein consists of 60 dimers, 30 of which are made of the subunits A and B. The remaining dimers are "CC dimers", forming a homodimer. The maturation protein replaces a CC dimer, resulting in 178 copies of the coat protein as opposed to the expected 180. Identifying characteristics of the Leviviridae coat proteins include a β-hairpin at the N-terminus, a β-sheet with five strands, and two α-helices at the C-terminus. Bacteriophage AP205 has many secondary protein structures, which contributes to its structural rigidity. The capsid self-assembles in vitro.

== Genome ==
Bacteriophage AP205 contains a (+) sense single stranded RNA genome. The genome length for single stranded RNA phages are short, including that of Bacteriophage AP205. However, the genome of AP205 is longer than other Leviviricetes, containing approximately 4268 nucleotides with coding regions for a lytic protein, maturation protein, coat protein, and an RNA-dependent RNA polymerase. The AP205 genome is longer than most single stranded RNA phages due to the presence of lengthy intercistronic regions, a long maturation gene, and two extra open reading frames before the maturation sequence.

=== Operator ===
The operator of AP205 contains a 4 nucleotide loop with adenosine at the first and last position with two other amino acids in between. This loop is typically present in the operator region of Leviviricetes. The AP205 operator region has a bulged adenosine on the hairpin structure similar to viruses in the Qubevirus genera. However, it is positioned closer to the 3' end of the hairpin structure.

=== Lytic gene ===
The first open reading frame (ORF) codes for a short lysis gene containing 35 amino acids. This gene is in a different position from the lytic genes of other viruses related to AP205. While other Leviviricetes encode their lytic genes between the coat and replicase proteins, AP205 has an open reading frame encoding a functional protein toward the 5' end of the genome that researchers suspect to have lytic function. The N-terminus of the gene consists of positively charged amino acids. The C-terminus consists of a group of non-polar amino acids. To confirm the function of the protein, researchers cloned the gene into a plasmid with a strong promoter. The plasmid was induced in E. coli, which resulted in limited cell growth when compared to the control. The enzymes encoded by the lysis protein do not disrupt the proton motive force of the host cell. This supports the theory that AP205 bacteriophage evolved and formed a lysis gene through utilizing a vacant area of the genome. The lytic protein of AP205 is produced in an efficient manner, and is used to lyse bacteria other than the host cell.

=== Maturation gene ===
Researchers suspect that the second open reading frame is involved in the translation of the maturation gene. Independent translation from the start codon of the second reading frame is suppressed by the lack of a strong Shine-Dalgarno sequence and a stable hairpin structure. The start codon of this ORF is within this strong hairpin secondary structure. The hairpin structure results in a translational rephrasing from the ORF2 reading frame to the A-protein (maturation protein) frame. The protein product of the maturation gene facilitates attachment of the bacteriophage to the host pilus through the cell attachment motif.

=== Coat protein gene ===
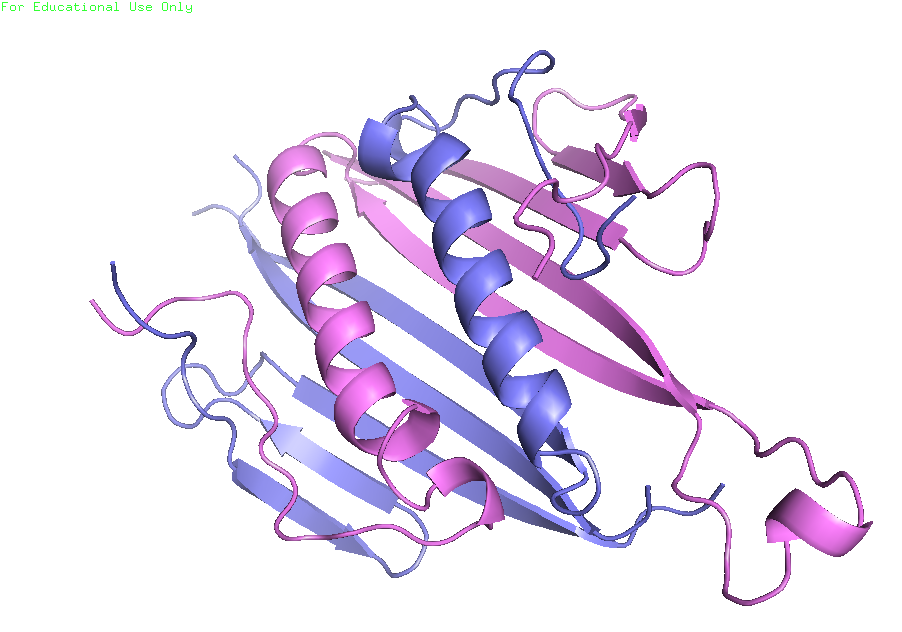
3D Structure of a Bacteriophage AP205 Coat Protein

The third ORF codes for the coat protein. The coat protein of AP205 varies from other single stranded RNA phages due to the presence of a C-terminal β-strand that is not seen in evolutionarily related particles. In every other known single stranded RNA bacteriophage, the first twenty amino acid of the coat protein form two β-strands (strands A and B) that combine and yield a β-hairpin on the exterior surface of the viral particle. In AP205, the first β-strand (strand A) of the coat protein is located at the same position as the second strand (strand B) in other phages. However, the C-terminal strand (strand B) in AP205 coincides with the first strand (strand A). The termini connect via an amino acid linker and yield a dimer, which serves as the subunit for capsid assembly. When dimerized, the C-terminus of one coat protein monomer is located close to the N-terminus of the other. The AP205 coat protein transfers the N-terminal β-strand strand to the C-terminus to yield circular permutation of the capsid. The result of this conformation is a lack of an AB loop formed by Strand A and B. The topology of the AP205 coat protein dimer resembles the double sandwich model of other ssRNA phages. The helices of AP205 form a wide gap that is filled with large side chains. The wider gaps result from a long αA subunit and the wide angle of which the αB subunit is to the αA subunit and the β-sheet. The space provided by the gaps is utilized by bulky side chains. The coat protein follows the conserved folding pattern of Leviviricetes with the exception of β-hairpin formation at the N-terminus.

=== Replicase gene ===
The final ORF encodes the replicase gene. The protein product of this sequence yields a RNA-dependent RNA polymerase. The replicase gene is controlled by the same mechanism in all single stranded RNA bacteriophages. The start codon is folded into a hairpin structure with an affinity for the coat protein. However, in AP205 there is no binding of the coat protein to the translational operator of the replicase gene to repress translation.

The genomic RNA of Bacteriophage AP205 is synthesized using a viral RNA-dependent RNA polymerase encoded in the replicase gene.

== Taxonomy ==
Single stranded RNA viruses are subject to higher levels of mutation when compared to other viruses, resulting in a diverse collection of genomic sequences. Single stranded RNA coliphages are classified into two genera: Qubevirus and Emesvirus, AP205 shares characteristics with viruses in both of these genera (such as the Emesvirus MS2 and the Quebevirus Qβ), and is phylogenetically classified between MS2 and Qβ. The operator region of displays identifying cahracteristics of both genera. The operator in AP205 has adenosine residues are in the same placement as those in Leviviricetes, but there is not a bulged adenosine at the same position of the hairpin loop in the operator. Viruses in the Quebevirus genera encode a coat extension protein, which the Leviviricetes genera lacks. AP205 does not contain this coat extension protein. AP205 has more genetic similarities to Leviviricetes, with the exception of the 3' UTR which has more similarities to a Quebevirus. There are many conserved sequences and motifs in AP205 that aide in the phylogenetic classification of the bacteriophage. The sequence UGCUU in the 3' untranslated region is preserved in all RNA coliphages, and is present in AP205. The RNA-dependent RNA polymerases of AP205 contain the conserved (Y)GGD motif present in other positive sense single stranded RNA bacteriophages.

== Infection ==
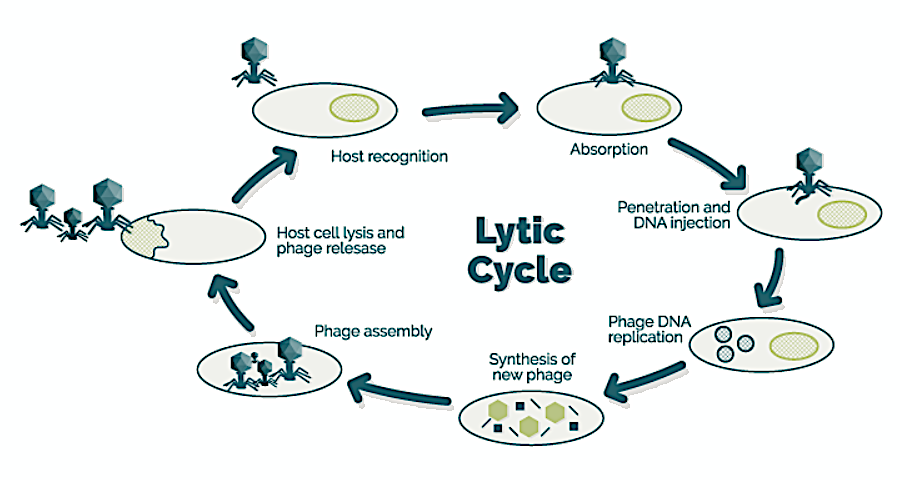
Bacteriophage AP205 is a lytic phage. Upon infection of a bacterium, the following cycle is completed within the host.

Bacteriophage AP205 infects gram-negative bacteria by attaching to and adsorbing into the pilus of the Acinetobacterium. The maturation protein recognizes the pilin subunits of the host’s pilus. AP205 uses type IV twitching pili for attachment to the host cell. Once bound to the pilus, the virus releases its genome into the bacteria by cleaving the maturation/A protein. During the later stages of infection in single stranded RNAs, the coat protein will bind to an RNA hairpin structure preceding the replicase gene. AP205 is an exception, and does not experience this type of interaction. In other single stranded RNA phages, a high concentration of the coat protein results in the binding of a dimer to the hairpin loop, which blocks ribosomal access. This halts transcription of the replicase protein, and results in packaging of the replicated viral genome. Further research is necessary to determine the termination of replicase translation. After the coat proteins are produced, the capsid experiences self-assembly. Circular permutation exposes the exterior termini on the coat proteins, which cluster together through various interactions. Once assembled, the virus will lyse the cell via the product of the lytic gene. The single-gene lysis mechanism of AP205 is unknown. However, the product of the lysis gene‘ in many single stranded RNA bacteriophages does not have any peptidoglycan degradation ability.

== Medical applications ==
=== Modular vaccine approach ===
The capsid of AP205 has 180 protein subunits. Each individual subunit can be fused to multiple peptides. Researchers have made an AP205 VLP with up to 370 peptides attached to the coat. The lack of an AB loop in AP205 provides an advantage to using the VLP in the development of vaccines. Peptide insertions to the area can destabilize the protein shell of the VLP and yield nonfunctional dimers. Bacteriophage AP205 has been used as a vector for delivering antigens in vaccines. The production of virus-like particles (VLP) derived from Bacteriophage AP205 can be used to display antigens that elicit an immune response in the target. Using a VLP as a vector for immunization does not pose a risk of transmitting disease due to the absence of a viral genome. AP205 serves as an attractive virus for this process due to its high tolerance for antigen fusion. The coat protein of an AP205 VLP can tolerate conjugation to many antigens due to the availability of both the N and C terminus. This availability of both termini is a limiting factor in the use of other VLPs in immunological studies.

=== Influenza ===
Bacteriophage AP205 has been used to make vaccines for influenza. By fusing the M2e extracellular domain of the influenza virus to the capsid of a AP205 VLP, researchers have been able to produce vaccines described to have protected infected mice from a lethal dosage of influenza. Researchers have fused the consensus sequence of the antigenic influenza M2e protein to the N-terminus of the capsid protein of AP205 by using a linker sequence. The VLP was propagated in E. coli. The genomic content within the M2e-AP205 VLP may be contaminated with RNA from the E. coli which the VLPs were propagated in, leading to induction of various antibodies that were not induced against the M2e. Mice immunized with M2e-AP205 that contained RNA from E. coli displayed more protection when compared to the mice immunized with M2e-AP205 that did not contain the RNA. These results indicate that the RNA within the VLP plays a role in the immunity provided against influenza.

=== Angiotensin II Receptor Type 1 ===
Researchers have used AP205 VLP to decrease blood pressure in hypertensive animal subjects. They produced a vaccine through conjugating the B cell epitope ATR001 to the AP205 capsid protein structure. The repetitive pattern of the ATR001 epitopes permitted the formation of immune complexes with IgM antibodies following exposure. In addition to activating humoral immunity in vivo, the ATR-AP205-001 vaccine resulted in enhanced differentiation of Tfh cells, leading to expression of proinflammatory cytokines such as IL-21. IL-21 is required for the activation of memory B cells that are specific to the ATR001 epitope. The ATR-AP205-001 vaccine resulted in a rapid humoral response initiated through the recruitment of dendritic cells, Tfh cells, and B cells with limited activation from regulatory T cells.

=== SARS-CoV-2 ===
Research studies have concluded that Bacteriophage AP205-VLPs can be used to generate a vaccine against SARS-CoV-2. Using the coat proteins of AP205, researchers have been able to present the receptor binding domain of the SARS-CoV-2 spike protein to invoke an immune response in mice. A stable AP205 VLP was designed by using a linker to fuse 2 capsid proteins, then adding the receptor binding motif (RBM) domain of the SARS-CoV-2 spike to the C terminus of the AP205 dimer. The formation of this complex was confirmed via SDS-PAGE and Electron Microscopy analysis. Each dimer in the AP205 VLP incorporated a RBM domain, resulting in 90 RBM domains per VLP. Mice immunized with the AP205-RBM experienced an increase in IgA response, RBD and spike protein specific antibody production, and class switching to IgG2a and IgG1 antibodies that was not observed in the control subjects. Researchers have also used SpyCatcher to fuse the RBD proteins to the capsid of an AP205VLP. To form a RBD-CLP particle, researchers fused a peptide-binding Tag and a gene linker to the N-terminus AP205 coat protein, which was then cloned into the pET28a(+) vector. The plasmid was transformed into competent E. coli cells, and the subsequent Tag-CLP products were purified. Researchers fused receptor binding domain antigens with a GSGS linker and the split-protein Catcher, and combined this product with the Tag-CLP to form RBD-CLP complexes. Mice immunized with this complex displayed induction of IgG2a and IgG2b antibodies.

=== West Nile virus ===
Cross-linking an antigen to the surface of a AP205 VLP can increase the immunogenicity of the protein. Vaccines made via the conjugation of DIII to AP205 VLPs induced high titers of antibodies specific to DIII after a single injection when compared to the groups of mice who were immunized with free DIII-C proteins and non-conjugated AP205 particles. The repetitive pattern of DIII on the capsid results in efficient cross-linking of B-Cell Receptors and leads to a specific humoral response in the host. Antigen presenting cells uptake the VLP, present the DIII antigen epitopes on the MHC II receptor to activate T helper cells. Bacterial RNA packaged within the BLP enhances antigen-presenting cell activity when it is delivered to the endosomal compartment and activates TLR 3 and TLR7/8. The AP205 subunits that were cross-linked to DIII-C molecules displayed an average of 50 DIII molecules per particle due to the availability of both the N and C terminus on the coat protein. The immunogenicity of the AP205 vaccine proved to be higher than the previous vaccines. VLPs made in this experiment contained about 25-30 micrograms of host cell E. Coli RNA per 100 micrograms of coat protein. The antibodies produced act to neutralize the infectious West Nile Virus particles.

== Other applications ==
=== Salmonid aquaculture ===
Bacteriophage AP2-5 can be used to target pathogenic bacterium in animals as well as human hosts. Bacteriophage AP205 can be used to vaccinate fish against A. salmonicida, a gram negative bacterium found in salmon with furunculosis. Research studies have used conjugated AP205 VLP-VapA to induce a strong antibody reaction in rainbow trout resulting in survival rates up to 44% higher than that of the control immunization.

=== Agriculture and waste water treatment ===
AP205 can be utilized as an indicator for microbial contaminants in water to reduce public health risks. While bacterial coliforms are usually used to determine contamination levels of water, viruses provide several advantages. Viruses are typically more resistant against UV radiation and other environmental stresses. AP205 shares a similar chemical composition and several physical characteristics similar to noroviruses and rotaviruses, allowing it to be used as a surrogate marker of contamination of crops by enteric viruses. AP205 is propagated in Acinetobacter baumannii, which can cause gastroenteritis in individuals who consume contaminated produce.
