= Bacteriophage φCb5 =

Virus classification
- (unranked): Virus
- Realm: Riboviria
- Kingdom: Orthornavirae
- Phylum: Lenarviricota
- Class: Leviviricetes
- Order: Timlovirales
- Family: Steitzviridae
- Genus: Cebevirus
- Species: Cebevirus halophobicum
- Virus: Caulobacter phage φCb5

Species of virus

Bacteriophage φCb5 is a bacteriophage that infects Caulobacter bacteria and other caulobacteria. The bacteriophage was discovered in 1970, it belongs to the genus Cebevirus of the Steitzviridae family and is the namesake of the genus. The bacteriophage is widely distributed in the soil, freshwater lakes, streams and seawater, places where caulobacteria inhabit and can be sensitive to salinity.

== Description ==
The capsid has icosahedral geometries, and T = 3 symmetry. It does not have a viral envelope. The diameter is around 26 nm. The genomes are linear, positive single-stranded RNA, and about 3.4 kb in length. The genome segmentation is monopartite and has 2 or 3 ORFs. Viral replication occurs in the cytoplasm and entry into the bacterial cell occurs by penetration into the pilus. The routes of transmission are by contact.

The bacteriophage is similar to the RNA bacteriophages of Escherichia in that it is composed of a single positive single-stranded RNA molecule and a protein coat with two structural proteins and apparently contains the genetic ability to encode a subunit of the coat protein, a maturation-like protein and a similar RNA replicase. The φCb5 bacteriophage differs from Escherichia RNA bacteriophages in host specificity, salt sensitivity, and the presence of histidine, but not methionine, in the coat protein. As for related bacteriophages, ORFs encode maturation, coat, RNA replicase, and lysis proteins, but unlike other members of Leviviricetes, the φCb5 lysis protein gene completely overlaps with RNA replicase in a single frame different reading. The lysis protein of φCb5 is approximately twice as long as that of the distantly related bacteriophage MS2 and presumably contains two transmembrane helices.
