= Bacteriophage f2 =

Virus classification
- (unranked): Virus
- Realm: Riboviria
- Kingdom: Orthornavirae
- Phylum: Lenarviricota
- Class: Leviviricetes
- Order: Norzivirales
- Family: Fiersviridae
- Genus: Emesvirus
- Species: Emesvirus zinderi
- Strain: Bacteriophage f2

Species of virus

Bacteriophage f2 is an icosahedral, positive-sense single-stranded RNA virus that infects the bacterium Escherichia coli. It is closely related to bacteriophage MS2 and assigned to the same species.

== History ==
f2 was the first RNA-containing bacteriophage to be isolated, reported in 1961. Tim Loeb and Norton Zinder identified two phages in filtered samples of raw New York City sewage that grew on male (F+) but not on female (F−) E. coli. The first phage f1, produced cloudy plaques, while the second phage, f2, produced clear plaques.
