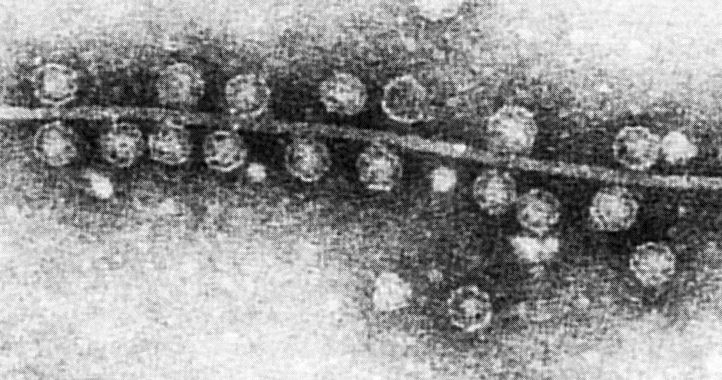

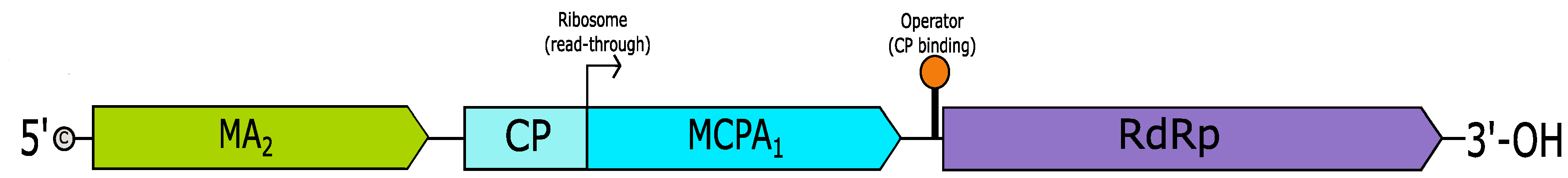
- TEM of Bacteriophage Qβ attached to the pilus of E. coli and its genome

Virus classification
- (unranked): Virus
- Realm: Riboviria
- Kingdom: Orthornavirae
- Phylum: Lenarviricota
- Class: Leviviricetes
- Order: Norzivirales
- Family: Fiersviridae
- Genus: Qubevirus

= Qubevirus =

Genus of viruses

Qubevirus is a genus of positive-strand RNA viruses, in the family Fiersviridae. Enterobacteria serve as natural hosts. There are three species in this genus. In 2020, the genus was renamed from Allolevivirus to its current name.

== Structure ==
Viruses in Qubevirus are non-enveloped, with icosahedral and spherical geometries, and T=3 symmetry. The diameter is around 26 nm.

== Genome ==
Qubeviruses have a positive-sense, single-stranded RNA genome. The genome is linear and non-segmented and around 4kb in length. The genome codes for four proteins, which are the coat, replicase, maturation, and lysis protein.

== Life cycle ==
Entry into the host cell is achieved by adsorption into the host cell. Replication follows the positive-strand RNA virus replication model. Positive-strand RNA virus transcription is the method of transcription. Translation takes place by suppression of termination. The virus exits the host cell by bacteria lysis. Enterobacteria serve as the natural host.

== Taxonomy ==
The genus Qubevirus has the following two species:

- Qubevirus durum, commonly called bacteriophage Qbeta
- Qubevirus escherichienecus
- Qubevirus faecium
