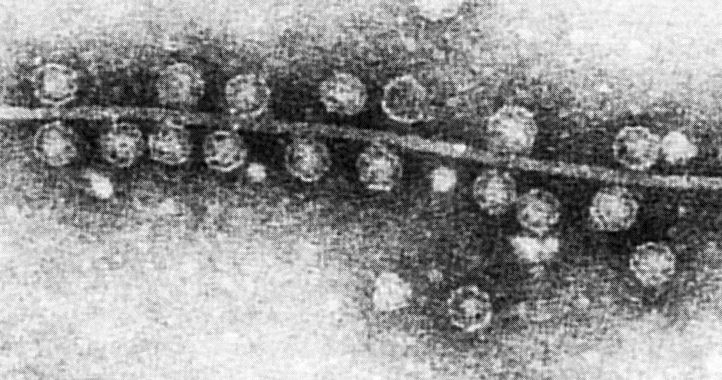

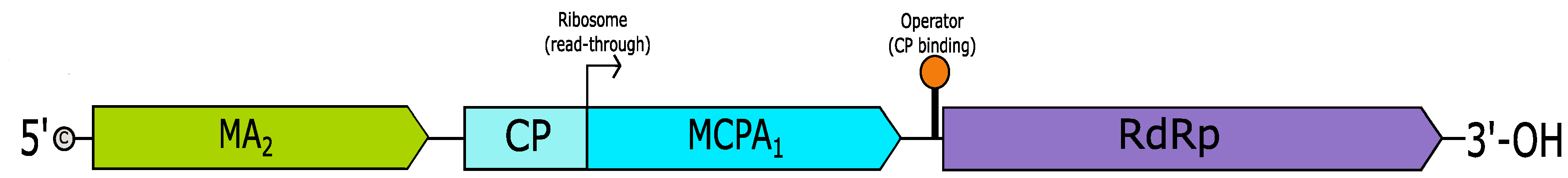
- TEM of bacteriophage Qβ attached to the pilus of E. coli and its genome

Virus classification
- (unranked): Virus
- Realm: Riboviria
- Kingdom: Orthornavirae
- Phylum: Lenarviricota
- Class: Leviviricetes
- Order: Norzivirales
- Family: Fiersviridae
- Genus: Qubevirus
- Species: Qubevirus durum

Member viruses
- Enterobacteria phage M11; Enterobacteria phage MX1; Enterobacteria phage ST; Enterobacteria phage VK

= Bacteriophage Qbeta =

Qubevirus durum

Species of virus

Bacteriophage Qbeta (Qubevirus durum), commonly referred to as Qbeta or Qβ, is a species consisting of several strains of positive-strand RNA virus which infects bacteria that have F-pili, most commonly Escherichia coli. Its linear genome is packaged into an icosahedral capsid with a diameter of 28 nm. Bacteriophage Qβ enters its host cell after binding to the side of the F-pilus.

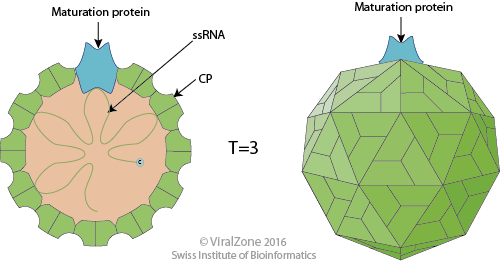
Schematic drawing of a levivirus virion (cross section and side view)

== Genetics ==
The genome of Qβ is approximately 4,217 nucleotides, depending on the source which sequenced the virus. Qβ has been isolated all over the world, multiple times, with various subspecies that code for nearly identical proteins but can have very different nucleotide sequences.

The genome has three open reading frames that encode four proteins: the maturation/lysis protein A2; the coat protein; a readthrough of a leaky stop codon in the coat protein, called A1; and the β-subunit of an RNA-dependent RNA-polymerase (RdRp) termed the replicase. The genome is highly structured, regulating gene expression and protecting itself from host RNases.

=== Coat protein A1 ===
There are approximately 178 copies of the coat protein and/or A1 in the capsid.

=== Replicase/RdRp ===
The RNA-dependent RNA polymerase that replicates both the positive and negative RNA strands is a complex of four proteins: the catalytic beta subunit (replicase, P14647) is encoded by the phage, while the other three subunits are encoded by the bacterial genome: alpha subunit (ribosomal protein S1), gamma subunit (EF-Tu), and delta subunit (EF-Ts).

The structure of the Qbeta RNA replicase has been solved (PDB: 3AGP, 3AGQ). The two EF proteins serve as a chaperone for both the replicase and the RNA product. In fact, pure Qbeta polymerase is not soluble enough to be produced in large quantities, and a fusion protein constructed from the replicase and the two EF subunits is usually used instead. The fusion can function independently of ribosomal protein S1.

=== Maturation/lysis protein A2 ===
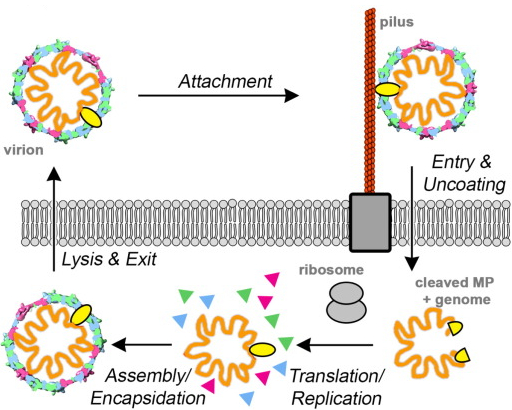
Life cycle of bacteriophage Qβ

All positive-strand RNA phages encode a maturation protein, whose function is to bind the host pilus and the viral RNA. The maturation protein is named thus, as amber mutants in the maturation protein are unable to infect their host, or are 'immature.' For the related +ssRNA bacteriophage MS2, the maturation protein was shown to be taken up by the host along with the viral RNA and the maturation protein was subsequently cleaved.

In bacteriophage MS2, the maturation protein is called the A protein, as it belongs to the first open reading frame in the viral RNA. In Qβ the A protein was initially thought to be A1, as it is more abundant within the virion and is also required for infection. However, once the sequence of Qβ was determined, A1 was revealed to be a readthrough of the leaky stop codon.

A2 is the maturation protein for Qβ and has an additional role of being the lysis protein.

The mechanism of lysis is similar to that of penicillin; A2 inhibits the formation of peptidoglycan by binding to MurA, which catalyzes the first enzymatically committed step in cell wall biosynthesis.

== Experiments ==
RNA from Bacteriophage Qβ was used by Sol Spiegelman in experiments that favored faster replication, and thus shorter strands of RNA. He ended up with Spiegelman's Monster, a minimal RNA chain of only 218 nucleotides that can be replicated by Qβ replicase.
