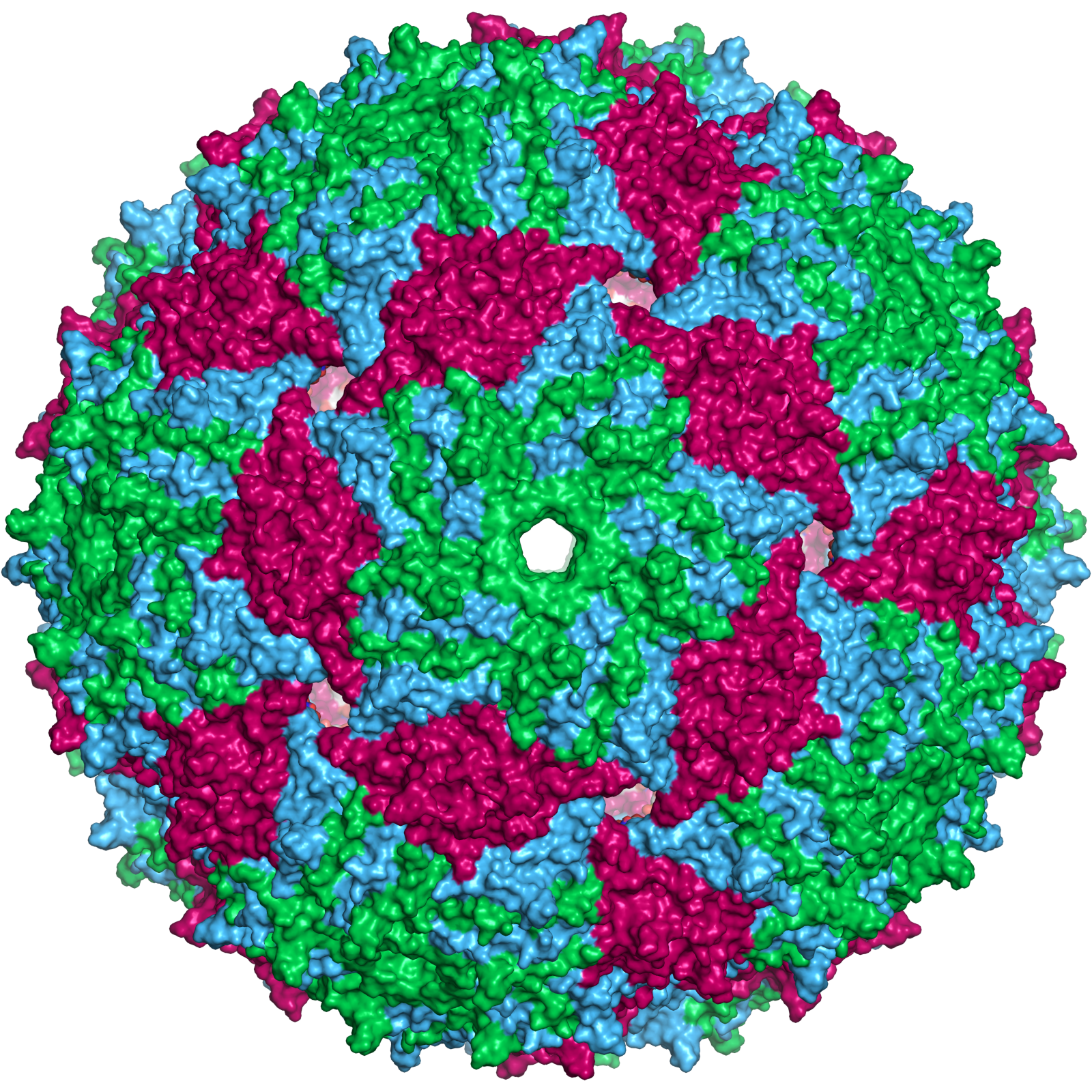

- Bacteriophage MS2 virion and genome with genes mat, cp, lys, and rep

Virus classification
- (unranked): Virus
- Realm: Riboviria
- Kingdom: Orthornavirae
- Phylum: Lenarviricota
- Class: Leviviricetes
- Order: Norzivirales
- Family: Fiersviridae
- Genus: Emesvirus

= Emesvirus =

Genus of viruses

Emesvirus is a genus of positive-strand RNA viruses, in the family Fiersviridae. Enterobacteria serve as natural hosts. There are three species in this genus. In 2020, the genus was renamed from Levivirus to its current name.

== Structure ==
Viruses in Emesvirus are non-enveloped, with icosahedral and Spherical geometries, and T=3 symmetry. The capsid diameter is around 26 nm.

== Genome ==
Emesviruses have a positive-sense, single-stranded RNA genome. The genome is linear and non-segmented and around 3.5kb in length. The genome codes for four proteins, which are the coat, replicase, maturation, and lysis protein.

== Life cycle ==
Entry into the host cell is achieved by adsorption into the host cell. Replication follows the positive-strand RNA virus replication model. Positive-strand RNA virus transcription is the method of transcription. Translation takes place by suppression of termination. The virus exits the host cell by bacteria lysis. Enterobacteria serve as the natural host.

== Taxonomy ==
The genus Emesvirus has the following two species:

- Emesvirus japonicum
- Emesvirus piscicola
- Emesvirus zinderi, commonly called bacteriophage MS2
