= Solspiviridae =

Virus classification
- (unranked): Virus
- Realm: Riboviria
- Kingdom: Orthornavirae
- Phylum: Lenarviricota
- Class: Leviviricetes
- Order: Norzivirales
- Family: Solspiviridae

Family of viruses

Solspiviridae is a family of RNA viruses, which infect prokaryotes.

== Taxonomy ==
Solspiviridae contains the following 55 genera:

- Andihavirus
- Begindovirus
- Dibaevirus
- Dilzevirus
- Duridgovirus
- Eosonovirus
- Etdyvivirus
- Fahrmivirus
- Hinehbovirus
- Insbruvirus
- Jargovirus
- Lunjuvirus
- Mahshuvirus
- Mintinovirus
- Puhrivirus
- Puirovirus
- Sexopuavirus
- Thiuhmevirus
- Tohkunevirus
- Tyrahlevirus
- Upirshuvirus
- Vendavirus
- Voulevirus
- Wahlkovirus
- Wahpevirus
- Wahrwivirus
- Wahtivirus
- Warmivirus
- Waspevirus
- Wedhlevirus
- Wehlfuvirus
- Wehsdovirus
- Welesbovirus
- Weothlivirus
- Whahdcavirus
- Whochfovirus
- Whotchuvirus
- Whotnavirus
- Wihbtavirus
- Wihlevirus
- Windevirus
- Witirovirus
- Wixfuvirus
- Woatevirus
- Wohlvevirus
- Wohtovirus
- Wolstavirus
- Woshavirus
- Wostovirus'
- Wruxevirus
- Wulfhavirus
- Wulmkuvirus
- Wulouvirus
- Wulvevirus
- Wurmloivirus
