= Blumeviridae =

Virus classification
- (unranked): Virus
- Realm: Riboviria
- Kingdom: Orthornavirae
- Phylum: Lenarviricota
- Class: Leviviricetes
- Order: Timlovirales
- Family: Blumeviridae

Family of viruses

Blumeviridae is a family of RNA viruses, which infect prokaryotes.

== Taxonomy ==
Blumeviridae contains the following 29 genera:

- Alehndavirus
- Bonghivirus
- Brahivirus
- Chimpavirus
- Dahmuivirus
- Dehgumevirus
- Dehkhevirus
- Espurtavirus
- Gifriavirus
- Hehrovirus
- Hisehlovirus
- Ivolevirus
- Kahnayevirus
- Kahraivirus
- Kemiovirus
- Kerishovirus
- Konmavirus
- Lirnavirus
- Marskhivirus
- Nehpavirus
- Niwtuvirus
- Pacehavirus
- Pahdacivirus
- Prorsmavirus
- Semodevirus
- Shihwivirus
- Strotovirus
- Wahdswovirus
- Yenihzavirus
