= Ourmiaviridae =

Virus classification
- (unranked): Virus
- Realm: Riboviria
- Kingdom: Orthornavirae
- Phylum: Lenarviricota
- Class: Miaviricetes
- Order: Ourlivirales
- Family: Ourmiaviridae

Family of viruses

Ourmiaviridae is a family of viruses. The family has 11 genera.

== Classification ==
The family contains the following genera:

- Alphaourmiavirus
- Betaourmiavirus
- Deltaourmiavirus
- Epsilonourmiavirus
- Etaourmiavirus
- Gammaourmiavirus
- Iotaourmiavirus
- Kappaourmiavirus
- Ourmiavirus
- Thetaourmiavirus
- Zetaourmiavirus
