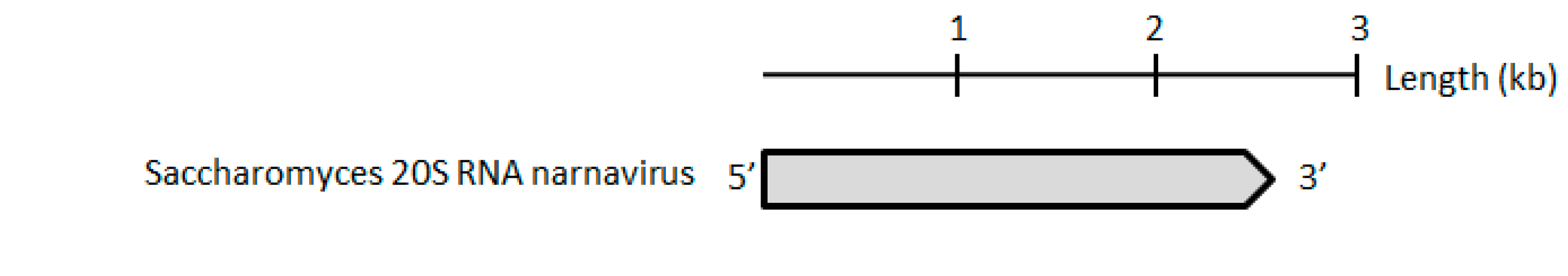
- Narnaviruses have no capsid or viral envelope, RNA genome and RdRp form a naked ribonucleoprotein complex

Virus classification
- (unranked): Virus
- Realm: Riboviria
- Kingdom: Orthornavirae
- Phylum: Lenarviricota
- Class: Amabiliviricetes
- Order: Wolframvirales
- Family: Narnaviridae
- Genus: Narnavirus

Species
- See text

= Narnavirus =

Genus of viruses

Narnavirus is a genus of positive-strand RNA viruses in the family Narnaviridae. Fungi serve as natural hosts. There are two species in this genus. Member viruses have been shown to be required for sexual reproduction of Rhizopus microsporus ("Narnaviruses decrease asexual reproduction, but together with Mycetohabitans, are required for sexual reproductive success. This fungal–bacterial-viral system represents an outstanding model to investigate three-way microbial symbioses and their evolution."). Narnaviruses have a naked RNA genome without a virion and derive their name from this feature.

== Virology ==
=== Structure ===
Narnaviruses have no true virion. They do not have structural proteins or a capsid.

=== Genome ===
Narnaviruses have nonsegmented, linear, positive-sense, single-stranded RNA genomes. The genome has one open reading frame which encodes the RNA-dependent RNA polymerase (RdRp). The genome is associated with the RdRp in the cytoplasm of the fungi host and forms a naked ribonucleoprotein complex.

=== Replication cycle ===
Viral replication is cytoplasmic. Replication follows the positive-strand RNA virus replication model. Positive-strand RNA virus transcription is the method of transcription. The virus exits the host cell by cell-to-cell movement. Fungi serve as the natural host. Transmission routes are parental and sexual.

== Taxonomy ==
The genus has the following species, listed by scientific name and followed by the exemplar virus of the species:

- Narnavirus saccharomaior, Saccharomyces 23S RNA narnavirus
- Narnavirus saccharominor, Saccharomyces 20S RNA narnavirus
