= SHEN26 =

Chemical compound

Identifiers
- IUPAC name: [(2R,4S,5R)-5-(4-aminopyrrolo[2,1-f][1,2,4]triazin-7-yl)-5-cyano-3,4-dihydroxyoxolan-2-yl]methyl cyclohexanecarboxylate
- CAS Number: 2691076-98-7
- PubChem CID: 162513663
- UNII: TU67MSW9UD

Chemical and physical data
- Formula: C_{19}H_{23}N_{5}O_{5}
- Molar mass: 401.423 g·mol^{−1}
- 3D model (JSmol): Interactive image
- SMILES: C1CCC(CC1)C(=O)OC[C@@H]2C([C@@H]([C@](O2)(C#N)C3=CC=C4N3N=CN=C4N)O)O
- InChI: InChI=InChI=1S/C19H23N5O5/c20-9-19(14-7-6-12-17(21)22-10-23-24(12)14)16(26)15(25)13(29-19)8-28-18(27)11-4-2-1-3-5-11/h6-7,10-11,13,15-16,25-26H,1-5,8H2,(H2,21,22,23)/t13-,15?,16+,19+/m1/s1; Key:NJZZWWHRMAGFGB-TVMOFBLASA-N

SHEN26 is an investigational new drug which is being evaluated by Shenzhen Kexing Pharmaceuticals for the treatment of COVID-19. It is an RNA replicase inhibitor.
