= Ourlivirales =

Virus classification
- (unranked): Virus
- Realm: Riboviria
- Kingdom: Orthornavirae
- Phylum: Lenarviricota
- Class: Miaviricetes
- Order: Ourlivirales

Order of viruses

Ourlivirales is an order of viruses. The order has three families.

== Classification ==
The order contains the following families:

- Botourmiaviridae
- Ourmiaviridae
- Rhizouliviridae
