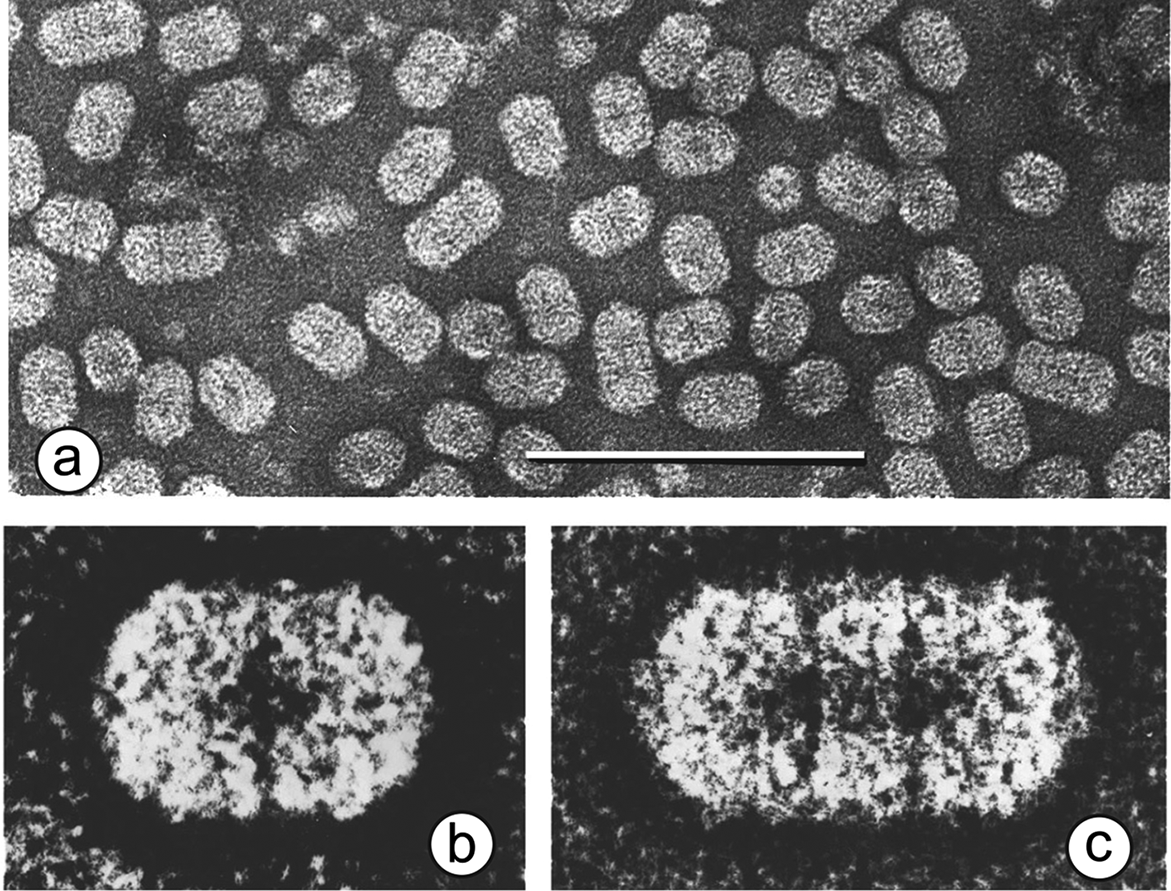

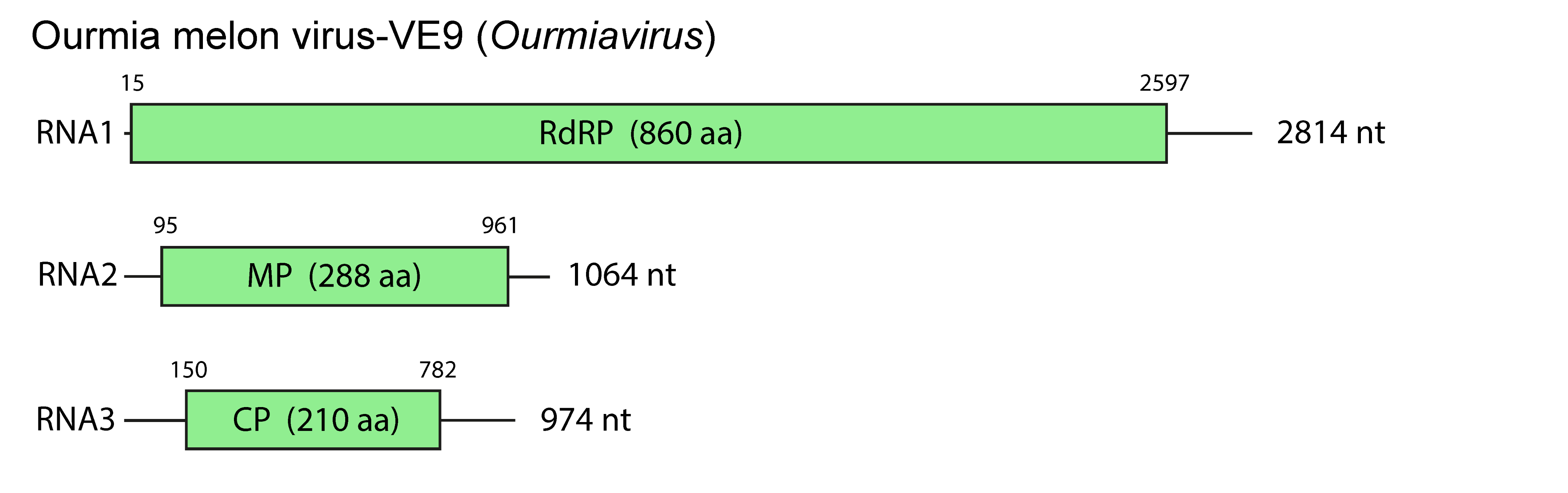
- TEM of Ourmia melon virus (bar, 100 nm), (b, c) commonest particle types (two- and three-disc), and genome

Virus classification
- (unranked): Virus
- Realm: Riboviria
- Kingdom: Orthornavirae
- Phylum: Lenarviricota
- Class: Miaviricetes
- Order: Ourlivirales
- Family: Botourmiaviridae
- Genus: Ourmiavirus

Species
- See text

= Ourmiavirus =

Genus of viruses

Ourmiavirus is a genus of positive-strand RNA viruses. Cucurbits, cherry, and cassava serve as natural hosts. There are three species in this genus. Diseases associated with this genus include: OuMV: yellowing and chlorotic spot symptoms.

== Structure ==
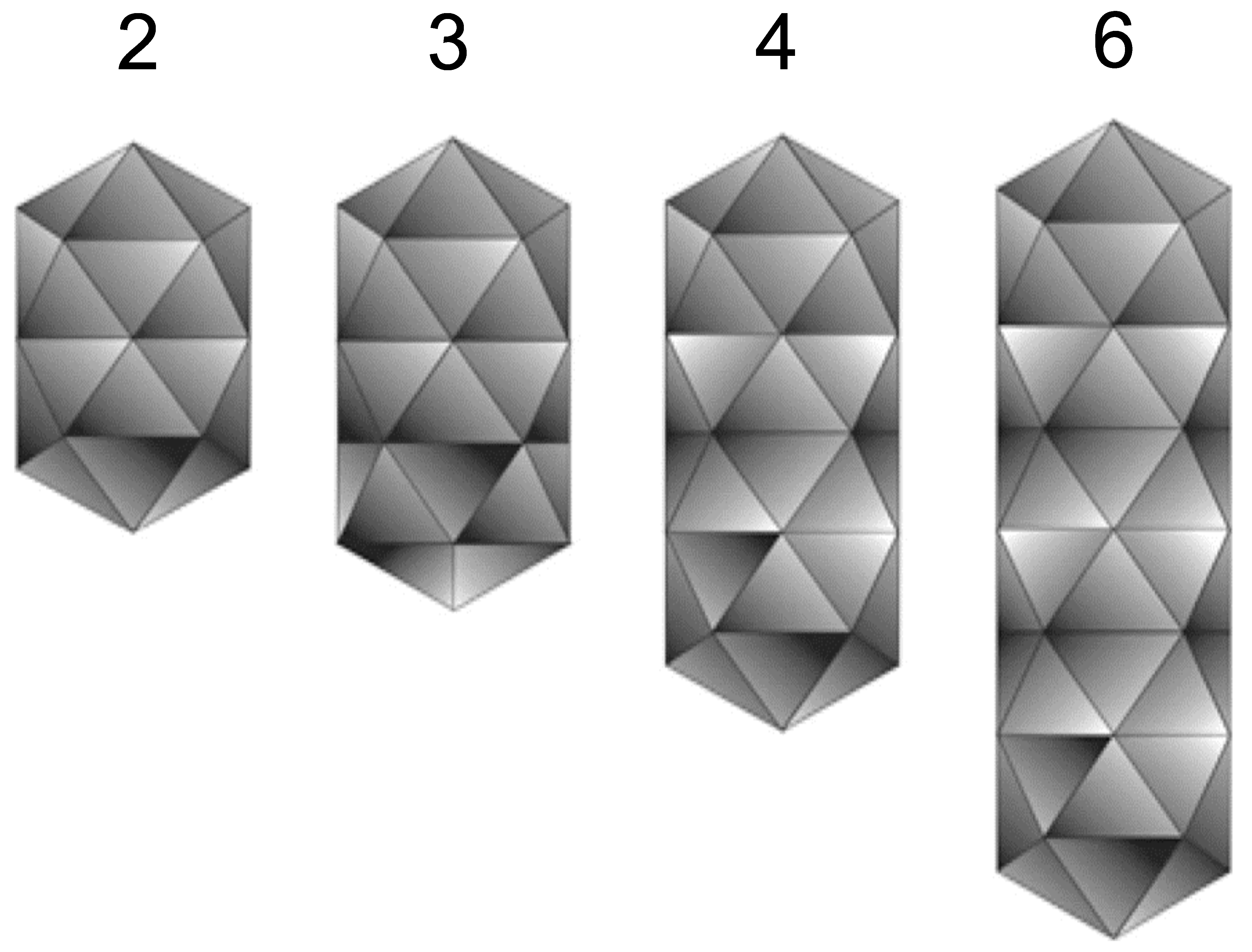
Ourmiavirus illustration shows number of double disks for different length. Each row of five triangles represents a double disk.

Viruses in the genus Ourmiavirus are non-enveloped, with icosahedral and bacilliform geometries, and T=1 symmetry. The diameter is around 18 nm, with a length of 30 nm.

== Genome ==
Genomes are linear and segmented, around 2.8kb in length.

== Life cycle ==
Viral replication is cytoplasmic. Entry into the host cell is achieved by penetration into the host cell. Replication follows the positive stranded RNA virus replication model. Positive stranded RNA virus transcription is the method of transcription. The virus exits the host cell by tubule-guided viral movement. Cucurbits, cherry, and cassava serve as the natural host.

== Taxonomy ==
The genus contains the following species, listed by scientific name and followed by the exemplar virus of the species:

- Ourmiavirus cucurbitae, Ourmia melon virus
- Ourmiavirus manihoti, Cassava virus C
- Ourmiavirus pruni, Epirus cherry virus
