= Duinviridae =

Virus classification
- (unranked): Virus
- Realm: Riboviria
- Kingdom: Orthornavirae
- Phylum: Lenarviricota
- Class: Leviviricetes
- Order: Norzivirales
- Family: Duinviridae

Family of viruses

Duinviridae is a family of RNA viruses, which infect prokaryotes.

== Taxonomy ==
Duinviridae contains the following 10 genera:

- Apeevirus
- Beshanovirus
- Cartwavirus
- Cubpivirus
- Derlivirus
- Dirlevirus
- Kahshuvirus
- Kohmavirus
- Samuneavirus
- Tehuhdavirus
