= John F. Atkins =

Irish geneticist and professor

- Born: Dunmanway, Ireland
- Education: Trinity College, Dublin (Ireland)
- Known for: Recoding, RNA World, Genetic Code
- Awards: Royal Irish Academy Gold Medal Award in 2007
- Scientific career
- Fields: Molecular genetics, RNA biology
- Workplaces: University College Cork (Ireland), University of Utah, Cold Spring Harbor Laboratory

John Fuller Atkins is a research professor at University College Cork and a member of the Royal Irish Academy since 2003. Atkins was the first Irish national to be elected as a member of the EMBO Organization. In 2002 Science Foundation Ireland appointed Atkins as its first Director of Biotechnology. Atkins is also an honorary Professor of Genetics at his alma mater Trinity College, Dublin.

== Research ==
Shortly after Crick and Brenner established the triplet nature of genetic decoding John Atkins showed that mRNA molecules are not always translated in a triplet manner. Since then Atkins focused on aspects of the genetic decoding that are in defiance of the standard genetic code – phenomena collectively described as Recoding. Recoding challenges the generality of the genetic decoding and encompasses phenomena such as programmed ribosomal frameshifting that violates triplet character of the genetic readout. Proteinogenic amino acids that are not part of the genetic code, e.g. the 21st amino acid selenocysteine and the 22nd amino acid pyrrolysine are also subjects of Recoding. John Atkins is an active proponent of the RNA World hypothesis and is an editor of The RNA World and RNA Worlds books. His research activities include a search for modern protein-free RNA-based life forms. In 2013 John Atkins organized installation of Charles Jencks sculpture ?What is Life? in Irish National Botanic Gardens. In 2021 a family of RNA bacteriophages Atkinsviridae was named in recognition of his involvement in the discovery of Bacteriophage MS2 lysin protein.
