= John Atkins =

John Atkins may refer to:

- John Atkins (American football) (born 1992), NFL defensive end
- John Atkins (cyclist) (born 1942), English cyclist
- John Atkins (MP) (1754–1838), English politician
- John Atkins (naval surgeon) (1685–1757), English doctor and author
- John Atkins (writer) (1916–2009), British writer
- John Black Atkins (1871–1954), British journalist
- John C. Atkins (born 1970), American politician from Delaware
- John D. C. Atkins (1825–1908), American politician
- John F. Atkins (born 1944), Irish scientist

== See also ==
- John Tracy Atkyns (died 1773), English barrister-at-law
- John Adkins (disambiguation)
