= Atkinsviridae =

Virus classification
- (unranked): Virus
- Realm: Riboviria
- Kingdom: Orthornavirae
- Phylum: Lenarviricota
- Class: Leviviricetes
- Order: Norzivirales
- Family: Atkinsviridae

Family of viruses

Atkinsviridae is a family of RNA viruses, which infect prokaryotes. The family contains 123 genera, which contain 262 species.
