= Steitzviridae =

Virus classification
- (unranked): Virus
- Realm: Riboviria
- Kingdom: Orthornavirae
- Phylum: Lenarviricota
- Class: Leviviricetes
- Order: Timlovirales
- Family: Steitzviridae

Family of viruses

Steitzviridae is a family of RNA viruses, which infect prokaryotes. The genus contains 202 genera, which contain 1,289 species.
