= Wolframvirales =

Virus classification
- (unranked): Virus
- Realm: Riboviria
- Kingdom: Orthornavirae
- Phylum: Lenarviricota
- Class: Amabiliviricetes
- Order: Wolframvirales

Order of viruses

Wolframvirales is an order of viruses.

== Taxonomy ==
The order contains the following families:

- Narnaviridae
- Splipalmiviridae
