= Mitovirus =

Mitoviridae
- Mitoviruses have no capsid or viral envelope, RNA genome and RdRp form a naked ribonucleoprotein complex

Virus classification
- (unranked): Virus
- Realm: Riboviria
- Kingdom: Orthornavirae
- Phylum: Lenarviricota
- Class: Howeltoviricetes
- Order: Cryppavirales
- Family: Mitoviridae

Genera
- See text

Family of viruses

Mitoviruses are a family of positive-strand RNA viruses that constitute the family Mitoviridae. Fungi serve as natural hosts. There are four genera in the family.

== Structure ==
Mitoviruses have no true virion. They do not have structural proteins or a capsid.

== Genome ==
Mitoviruses have nonsegmented, linear, positive-sense, single-stranded RNA genomes. The genome has one open reading frame which encodes the RNA-dependent RNA polymerase (RdRp). The genome is associated with the RdRp in the cytoplasm of the fungi host and forms a naked ribonucleoprotein complex.

== Life cycle ==
Viral replication is cytoplasmic. Replication follows the positive-strand RNA virus replication model. Positive-strand RNA virus transcription is the method of transcription. The virus exits the host cell by cell-to-cell movement. Fungi serve as the natural host. Transmission routes are parental and sexual.

== Taxonomy ==
The family contains four genera:

- Duamitovirus
- Kvaramitovirus
- Triamitovirus
- Unuamitovirus
