= Transcriptional bursting =

Property of genes where transcription from DNA to RNA occurs in "bursts"

Transcriptional bursting, also known as transcriptional pulsing, is a fundamental property of genes in which transcription from DNA to RNA can occur in "bursts" or "pulses", which has been observed in diverse organisms, from bacteria to mammals.

== Detection of the phenomenon ==
This phenomenon came to light with the advent of technologies, such as MS2 tagging and single molecule RNA fluorescence in situ hybridisation, to detect RNA production in single cells, through precise measurements of RNA number or RNA appearance at the gene. Other, more widespread techniques, such as Northern blotting, microarrays, RT-PCR and RNA-Seq, measure bulk RNA levels from homogenous population extracts. These techniques lose dynamic information from individual cells and give the impression that transcription is a continuous smooth process. Observed at an individual cell level, transcription is irregular, with strong periods of activity interspersed by long periods of inactivity.

== Mechanism ==
Bursting may result from the stochastic nature of biochemical events superimposed upon a two step fluctuation. In its simplest form, the gene is proposed to exist in two states, one where activity is negligible and one where there is a certain probability of activation. Only in the second state does transcription readily occur. It seems likely that some rudimentary eukaryotes have genes which do not show bursting. The genes are always in the permissive state, with a simple probability describing the numbers of RNAs generated.

More recent data indicate the two state model can be an oversimplification. Transcription of the c-Fos gene in response to serum stimulation can, for the most part, be summarised by two states, although at certain times after stimulation, a third state better explains the variance in the data. Another model suggests a two state model can apply, but with each cell having a different transcription rate in the active state. Other analyses indicate a spectrum or continuum of activity states. The nuclear and signaling landscapes of complex eukaryotic nuclei may favour more than two simple states- for example, there are over several dozen post-translational modifications of nucleosomes and perhaps a hundred different proteins involved in the average eukaryotic transcription reaction.

What do the repressive and permissive states represent? An attractive idea is that the repressed state is a closed chromatin conformation whilst the permissive states are more open. Another hypothesis is that the fluctuations between states reflect reversible transitions in the binding and dissociation of pre-initiation complexes. Bursts may also result from bursty signalling, cell cycle effects or movement of chromatin to and from transcription factories. Bursting dynamics have been demonstrated to be influenced by cell size and the frequency of extracellular signalling. Recent data suggest different degrees of supercoiling distinguish the permissive and inactive states.

The bursting phenomenon, as opposed to simple probabilistic models of transcription, can account for the high variability (see transcriptional noise) in gene expression occurring between cells in isogenic populations. This variability in turn can have tremendous consequences on cell behaviour, and must be mitigated or integrated. Suggested mechanisms by which noise can be dampened include strong extracellular signalling, diffusion of RNA and protein in cell syncitia, promoter proximal pausing, and nuclear retention of transcripts. In certain contexts, such as the survival of microbes in rapidly changing stressful environments, the expression variability may be essential. Variability also impacts upon the effectiveness of clinical treatment, with resistance of bacteria to antibiotics demonstrably caused by non-genetic differences. Similar phenomena may contribute to the resistance of sub-populations of cancer cells to chemotherapy. Spontaneous variability in gene expression is also proposed to act as a source of cell fate diversity in self-organizing differentiation processes, and may act as a barrier to effective cellular reprogramming strategies.
