= Coliphage =

Bacteriophage that infects coliform bacteria

A coliphage is a type of bacteriophage that infects coliform bacteria such as Escherichia coli. Coliphage originate almost exclusively from human feces and from other warm-blooded animals. When certain circumstances are met, such as a large number of susceptible hosts present at the right temperature, they can only partially replicate in sewage and contaminated waters.

Examples include Enterobacteria phage λ and species from the family Fersviridae. Coliphage levels reflect the persistence of pathogenic viruses in the environment and have been proposed as an indicator of fecal contamination in water.
