= John Adkins =

John Adkins may refer to:

- John Scudder Adkins (1872–1931), American architect
- John Rainey Adkins (1941–1989), American guitarist and songwriter

== See also ==
- John Atkins (disambiguation)
- Jon Adkins (born 1977), American baseball pitcher
