= Timlovirales =

Virus classification
- (unranked): Virus
- Realm: Riboviria
- Kingdom: Orthornavirae
- Phylum: Lenarviricota
- Class: Leviviricetes
- Order: Timlovirales

Order of viruses

Timlovirales is an order of viruses, which infect prokaryotes. Most of these bacteriophages were discovered by metagenomics.

== Taxonomy ==
Timlovirales contains the following two families:

- Blumeviridae
- Steitzviridae
