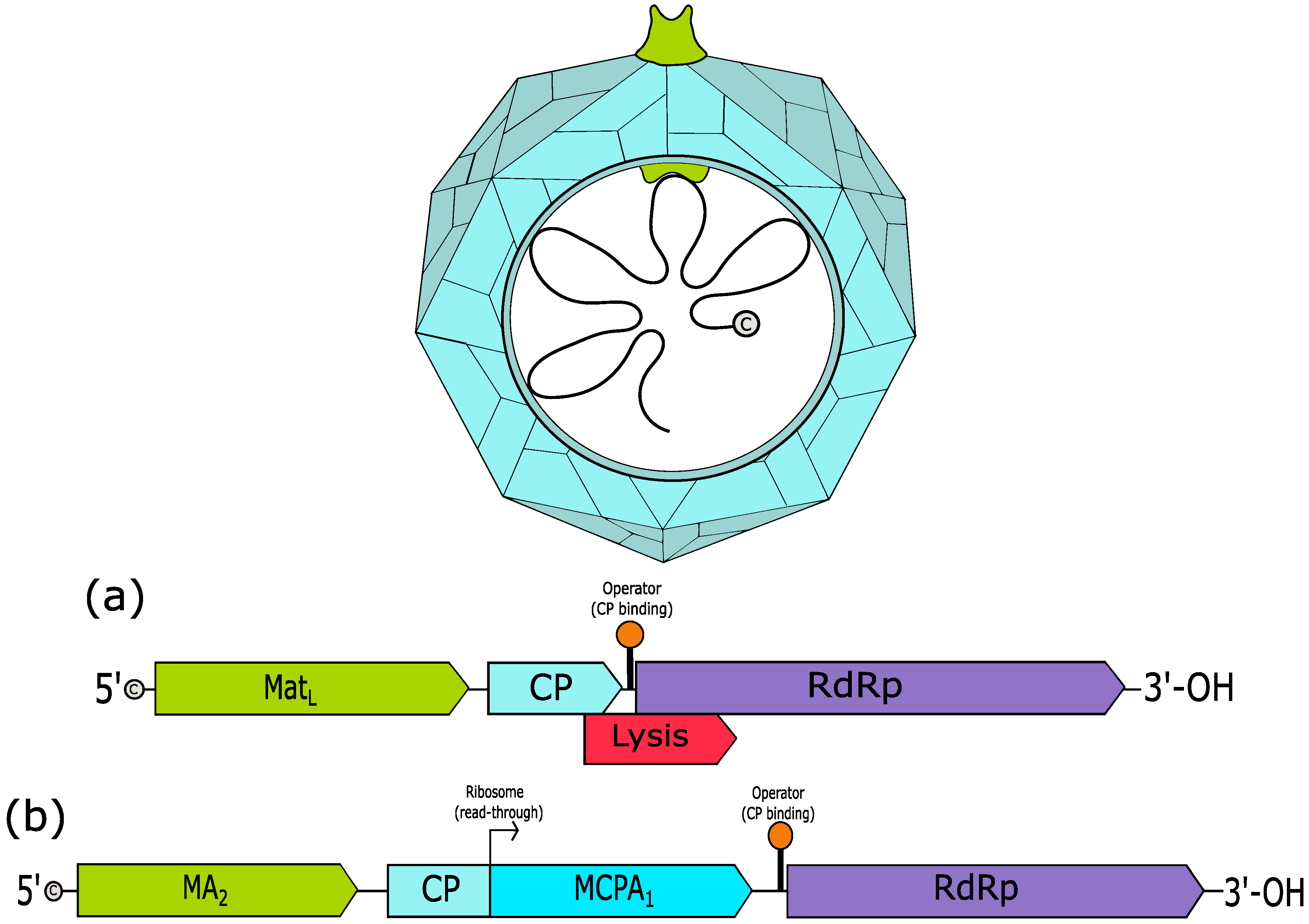
- Fiersviridae virion and genomes of (a) bacteriophage MS2 and (b) bacteriophage Qβ

Virus classification
- (unranked): Virus
- Realm: Riboviria
- Kingdom: Orthornavirae
- Phylum: Lenarviricota
- Class: Leviviricetes
- Order: Norzivirales
- Family: Fiersviridae

Genera
- See text

= Fiersviridae =

Family of viruses

Fiersviridae is a family of positive-strand RNA viruses which infect prokaryotes. Bacteria serve as the natural host. They are small viruses with linear, positive-sense, single-stranded RNA genomes that encode four proteins. All phages of this family require bacterial pili to attach to and infect cells. The family has 308 genera, most discovered by metagenomics. In 2020, the family was renamed from Leviviridae to its current name.

== Structure ==
Viruses in Fiersviridae are non-enveloped, with icosahedral and spherical geometries, and T=3 symmetry. Their virion diameter is around 26 nm.

== Genome ==
Fiersviruses have a positive-sense, single-stranded RNA genome. It is linear and non-segmented and around 4kb in length. The genome encodes four proteins, which are the coat, replicase, maturation, and lysis protein.

== Life cycle ==
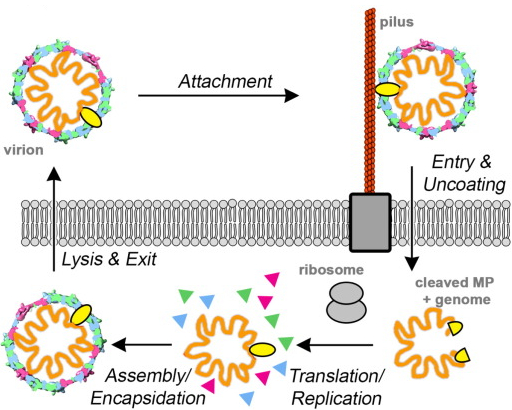
Fiersviridae life cycle

Entry into the host cell is achieved by adsorption into the host cell. Replication follows the positive-strand RNA virus replication model. Positive-strand RNA virus transcription is the method of transcription. Translation takes place by suppression of termination. The virus exits the host cell by bacteria lysis. Bacteria serve as the natural host.

== Taxonomy ==
Fiersviridae contains 308 genera. This taxonomic family was named after Belgian Microbiologist Walter Fiers, who first sequenced the RNA phage MS2, a model phage for this family. Two notable genera are Emesvirus, which contains bacteriophage MS2, and Qubevirus, which contains bacteriophage Qbeta.
