= Transcriptional noise =

Transcriptional noise is a primary cause of the variability (noise) in gene expression occurring between cells in isogenic populations (see also cellular noise) . A proposed source of transcriptional noise is transcriptional bursting although other sources of heterogeneity, such as unequal separation of cell contents at mitosis are also likely to contribute considerably. Bursting transcription, as opposed to simple probabilistic models of transcription, reflects multiple states of gene activity, with fluctuations between states separated by irregular intervals, generating uneven protein expression between cells. Noise in gene expression can have tremendous consequences on cell behaviour, and must be mitigated or integrated. In certain contexts, such as establishment of viral latency, the survival of microbes in rapidly changing stressful environments, or several types of scattered differentiation, the variability may be essential. Variability also impacts upon the effectiveness of clinical treatment, with resistance of bacteria and yeast to antibiotics demonstrably caused by non-genetic differences. Variability in gene expression may also contribute to resistance of sub-populations of cancer cells to chemotherapy and appears to be a barrier to curing HIV.
