= Suraxavir marboxil =

Investigational drug

Identifiers
- IUPAC name: [(3R)-2-[(11S)-7,8-difluoro-6,11-dihydrobenzo[c][1]benzothiepin-11-yl]-9,12-dioxospiro[5-oxa-1,2,8-triazatricyclo[8.4.0.0^{3,8}]tetradeca-10,13-diene-6,1'-cyclopropane]-11-yl]oxymethyl methyl carbonate
- CAS Number: 2364589-86-4
- PubChem CID: 153289974
- UNII: A72V8WPZ9F

Chemical and physical data
- Formula: C_{29}H_{25}F_{2}N_{3}O_{7}S
- Molar mass: 597.59 g·mol^{−1}
- 3D model (JSmol): Interactive image
- SMILES: COC(=O)OCOC1=C2C(=O)N3CC4(CC4)OC[C@H]3N(N2C=CC1=O)[C@H]5C6=C(CSC7=CC=CC=C57)C(=C(C=C6)F)F
- InChI: InChI=InChI=1S/C29H25F2N3O7S/c1-38-28(37)40-15-39-26-20(35)8-11-33-25(26)27(36)32-14-29(9-10-29)41-12-22(32)34(33)24-16-6-7-19(30)23(31)18(16)13-42-21-5-3-2-4-17(21)24/h2-8,11,22,24H,9-10,12-15H2,1H3/t22-,24+/m1/s1; Key:IVHSRYSBKJOVJK-VWNXMTODSA-N

Suraxavir marboxil is an investigational new drug that is being evaluated by Jiangxi Qingfeng Pharmaceutical for the treatment of influenza virus infection. It is an inhibitor or the cap-dependent RNA-dependent RNA polymerase of the influenza A and B virus.

Suraxavir marboxil is a prodrug that is metabolized to the active drug suraxavir (GP1707D07).
