= Tivoxavir marboxil =

Investigational drug

Clinical data
- Other names: TRX-100, AV5124, viroksavir, viroxavir

Identifiers
- IUPAC name: [(3R)-2-[(10S)-6,7-difluoro-5,10-dihydrothieno[3,2-c][2]benzothiepin-10-yl]-9,12-dioxo-5-oxa-1,2,8-triazatricyclo[8.4.0.03,8]tetradeca-10,13-dien-11-yl]oxymethyl methyl carbonate
- CAS Number: 2417851-93-3
- PubChem CID: 155280058
- UNII: 8P73TA5CLC

Chemical and physical data
- Formula: C_{25}H_{21}F_{2}N_{3}O_{7}S_{2}
- Molar mass: 577.57 g·mol^{−1}
- 3D model (JSmol): Interactive image
- SMILES: COC(=O)OCOC1=C2C(=O)N3CCOC[C@H]3N(N2C=CC1=O)[C@H]4C5=C(CSC6=C4SC=C6)C(=C(C=C5)F)F
- InChI: InChI=InChI=1S/C25H21F2N3O7S2/c1-34-25(33)37-12-36-22-16(31)4-6-29-21(22)24(32)28-7-8-35-10-18(28)30(29)20-13-2-3-15(26)19(27)14(13)11-39-17-5-9-38-23(17)20/h2-6,9,18,20H,7-8,10-12H2,1H3/t18-,20+/m1/s1; Key:JFAAVTYPCCKWCW-QUCCMNQESA-N

Tivoxavir marboxil is an investigational new drug that is being evaluated by Traws Pharma, Inc. for the treatment of influenza. It is a cap-dependent endonuclease inhibitor.

== Chemistry ==
Tivoxavir marboxil the prodrug form of tivoxavir. The carbonate containing sidechain (marboxil) is cleaved enzymatically to yield the active form of the drug tivoxavir.
