= Botourmiaviridae =

Virus classification
- (unranked): Virus
- Realm: Riboviria
- Kingdom: Orthornavirae
- Phylum: Lenarviricota
- Class: Miaviricetes
- Order: Ourlivirales
- Family: Botourmiaviridae

Family of viruses

Botourmiaviridae is a family of positive-strand RNA viruses that infect plants and fungi. The family contains nine genera.

== Classification ==
The family contains the following genera:

- Betabotoulivirus
- Betascleroulivirus
- Botoulivirus
- Deltascleroulivirus
- Epsilonscleroulivirus
- Gammascleroulivirus
- Magoulivirus
- Penoulivirus
- Scleroulivirus
