= Norzivirales =

Virus classification
- (unranked): Virus
- Realm: Riboviria
- Kingdom: Orthornavirae
- Phylum: Lenarviricota
- Class: Leviviricetes
- Order: Norzivirales

Order of viruses

Norzivirales is an order of viruses, which infect prokaryotes. Most of these bacteriophages were discovered by metagenomics.

== Taxonomy ==
Norzivirales contains the following four families:

- Atkinsviridae
- Duinviridae
- Fiersviridae
- Solspiviridae
