= RNA-dependent RNA polymerase =

Enzyme that synthesizes RNA from an RNA template

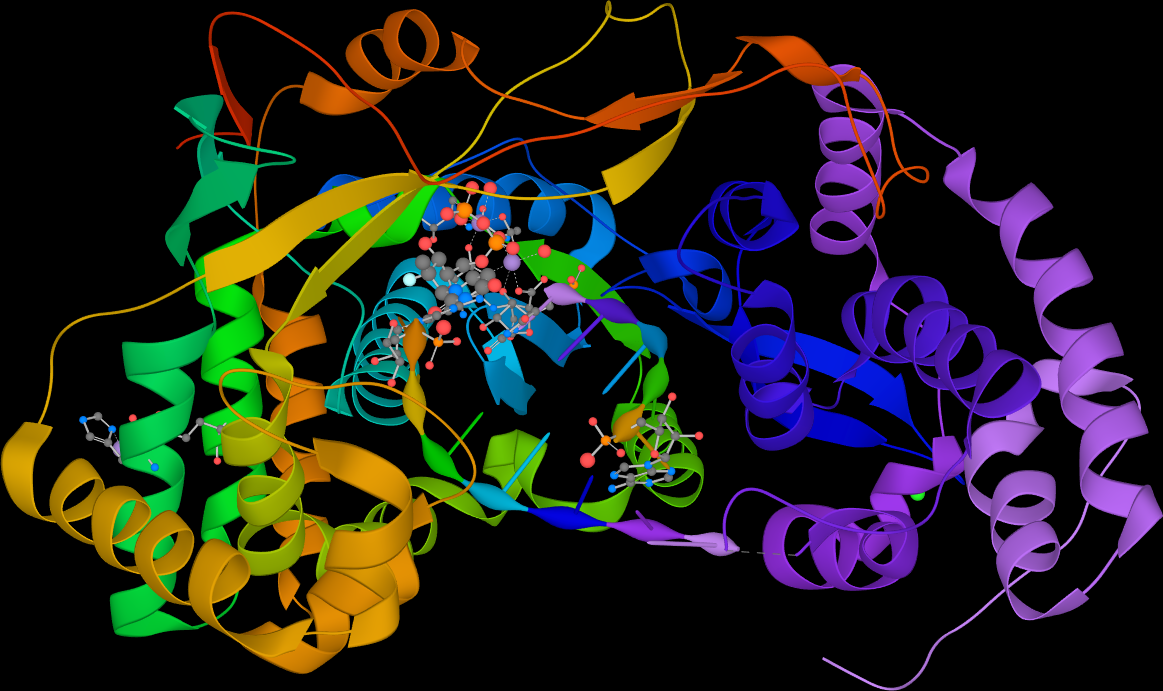
- Stalled Hepatitis C virus RNA replicase (NS5B), in complex with sofosbuvir (PDB 4WTG).

Identifiers
- EC no.: 2.7.7.48
- CAS no.: 9026-28-2

Databases
- BRENDA: enzyme data
- ExPASy: NiceZyme view
- KEGG: enzyme entry
- MetaCyc: metabolic pathway
- Rhea: reactions
- PDB structures: RCSB PDB PDBe PDBsum
- Gene Ontology: AmiGO / QuickGO
Search
- PMC: articles
- PubMed: articles
- NCBI: proteins

RNA-dependent RNA polymerase (RdRp) or RNA replicase is an enzyme that catalyzes the replication of RNA from an RNA template. Specifically, it catalyzes synthesis of the RNA strand complementary to a given RNA template. This is in contrast to typical DNA-dependent RNA polymerases (DdRP), which all organisms use to catalyze the transcription of RNA from a DNA template.

RdRp is an essential protein encoded in the genomes of most RNA-containing viruses that lack a DNA stage. Some eukaryotes also contain RdRps, which are involved in RNA interference and differ structurally from viral RdRps.

== History ==
Viral RdRps were discovered in the early 1960s from studies on Picornaviruses when it was observed that these viruses were not sensitive to actinomycin D, a drug that inhibits cellular DNA-directed RNA synthesis. This lack of sensitivity suggested the action of a virus-specific enzyme that could copy RNA from an RNA template.

== Distribution ==
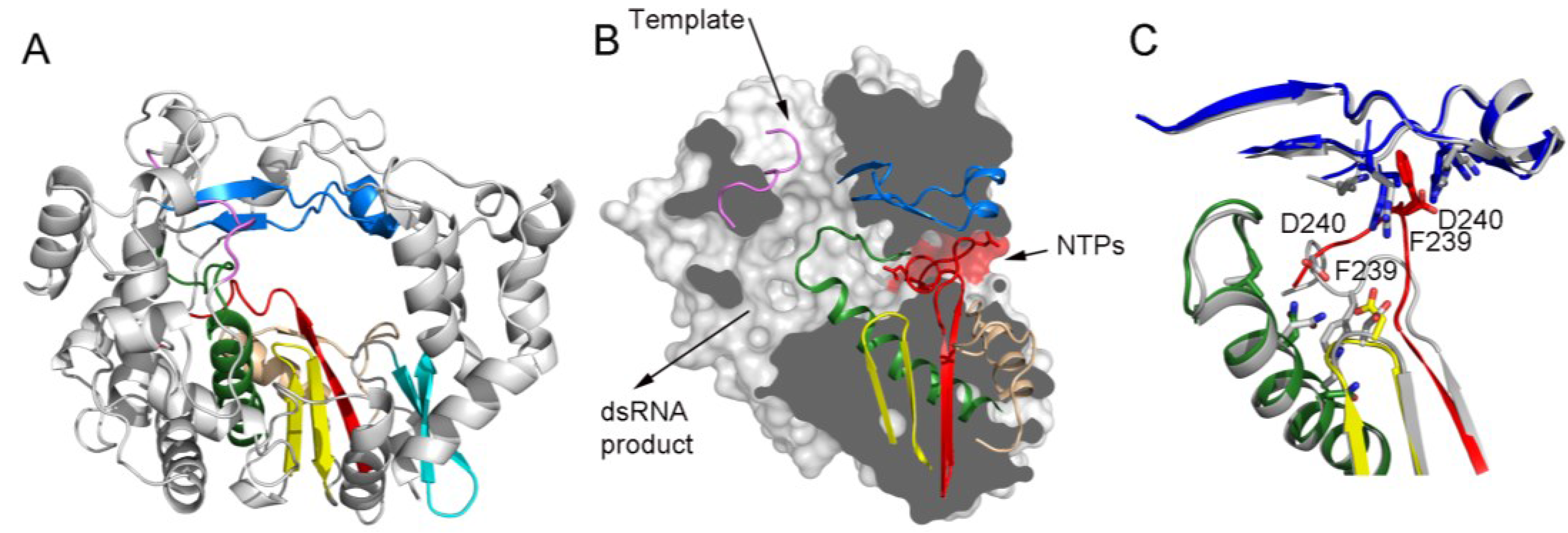

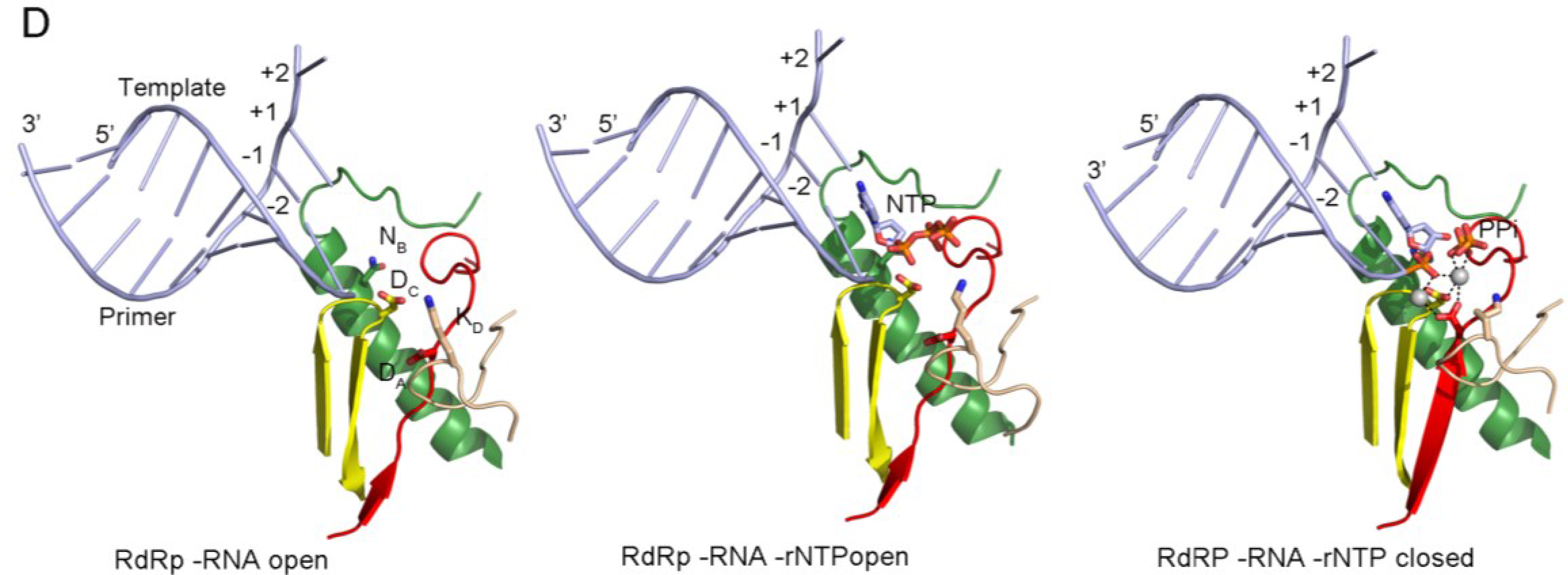
Structure and replication elongation mechanism of a RdRp

RdRps are highly conserved in viruses and are related to telomerase, though the reason for this was an ongoing question as of 2009. The similarity led to speculation that viral RdRps are ancestral to human telomerase.

The most famous example of RdRp is in poliovirus. The viral genome is composed of RNA, which enters the cell through receptor-mediated endocytosis. From there, the RNA acts as a template for complementary RNA synthesis. The complementary strand acts as a template for the production of new viral genomes that are packaged and released from the cell ready to infect more host cells. The advantage of this method of replication is that no DNA stage complicates replication. The disadvantage is that no 'back-up' DNA copy is available.

Many RdRps associate tightly with membranes making them difficult to study. The best-known RdRps are polioviral 3Dpol, vesicular stomatitis virus L, and hepatitis C virus NS5B protein.

Many eukaryotes have RdRps that are involved in RNA interference: these amplify microRNAs and small temporal RNAs and produce double-stranded RNA using small interfering RNAs as primers. These RdRps are used in defense mechanisms and can be appropriated by RNA viruses. Their evolutionary history predates the divergence of major eukaryotic groups.

== Replication ==
RdRp differs from DNA-dependent RNA polymerase as it catalyzes RNA synthesis of strands complementary to a given RNA template. The RNA replication process is a four-step mechanism:

- Nucleoside triphosphate (NTP) binding – initially, the RdRp presents with a vacant active site in which an NTP binds, complementary to the corresponding nucleotide on the template strand. Correct NTP binding causes the RdRp to undergo a conformational change.
- Active site closure – the conformational change, initiated by the correct NTP binding, results in the restriction of active site access and produces a catalytically competent state.
- Phosphodiester bond formation – two Mg^{2+} ions are present in the catalytically active state and arrange themselves around the newly synthesized RNA chain such that the substrate NTP undergoes a phosphatidyl transfer and forms a phosphodiester bond with the new chain. Without the use of these Mg^{2+} ions, the active site is no longer catalytically stable and the RdRp complex changes to an open conformation.
- Translocation – once the active site is open, the RNA template strand moves by one position through the RdRp protein complex and continues chain elongation by binding a new NTP, unless otherwise specified by the template.

RNA synthesis can be performed by a primer-independent (de novo) or a primer-dependent mechanism that utilizes a viral protein genome-linked (VPg) primer. The de novo initiation consists in the addition of a NTP to the 3'-OH of the first initiating NTP. During the following elongation phase, this nucleotidyl transfer reaction is repeated with subsequent NTPs to generate the complementary RNA product. Termination of the nascent RNA chain produced by RdRp is not completely known, however, RdRp termination is sequence-independent.

One major drawback of RNA-dependent RNA polymerase replication is the transcription error rate. RdRps lack fidelity on the order of 10^{4} nucleotides, which is thought to be a direct result of inadequate proofreading. This variation rate is favored in viral genomes as it allows for the pathogen to overcome host defenses trying to avoid infection, allowing for evolutionary growth.

== Structure ==
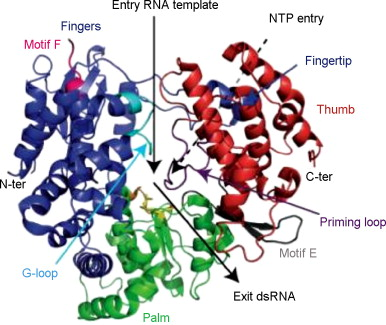
Overview of the flavivirus RdRp structure based on West Nile Virus (WNV) NS5Pol

Viral/prokaryotic RdRp, along with many single-subunit DdRp, employ a fold whose organization has been linked to the shape of a right hand with three subdomains termed fingers, palm, and thumb. Only the palm subdomain, composed of a four-stranded antiparallel beta sheet with two alpha helices, is well conserved. In RdRp, the palm subdomain comprises three well-conserved motifs (A, B, and C). Motif A (D-x(4,5)-D) and motif C (GDD) are spatially juxtaposed; the aspartic acid residues of these motifs are implied in the binding of Mg^{2+} and/or Mn^{2+}. The asparagine residue of motif B is involved in selection of ribonucleoside triphosphates over dNTPs and, thus, determines whether RNA rather than DNA is synthesized. The domain organization and the 3D structure of the catalytic centre of a wide range of RdRps, even those with a low overall sequence homology, are conserved. The catalytic center is formed by several motifs containing conserved amino acid residues.

Eukaryotic RNA interference requires a cellular RdRp (c RdRp). Unlike the "hand" polymerases, they resemble simplified multi-subunit DdRPs, specifically in the catalytic β/β' subunits, in that they use two sets of double-psi β-barrels in the active site. QDE1 (Q9Y7G6) in Neurospora crassa, which has both barrels in the same chain, is an example of such a c RdRp enzyme. Bacteriophage homologs of c RdRp, including the similarly single-chain DdRp yonO (O31945), appear to be closer to c RdRps than DdRPs are.

RNA dependent RNA polymerase (Note: See Pfam clan for other (+)ssRNA/dsRNA families.)

Identifiers
- Symbol: RdRP_1
- Pfam: PF00680
- Pfam clan: CL0027
- InterPro: IPR001205
- SCOP2: 2jlg / SCOPe / SUPFAM
Available protein structures:
- PDB: IPR001205 PF00680 (ECOD; PDBsum)
- AlphaFold: IPR001205; PF00680

RNA-dependent RNA polymerase, eukaryotic-type

Identifiers
- Symbol: RdRP_euk
- Pfam: PF05183
- InterPro: IPR007855
Available protein structures:
- PDB: 2j7n IPR007855 PF05183 (ECOD; PDBsum)
- AlphaFold: IPR007855; PF05183

Bunyavirus RNA replicase (Note: A (−)ssRNA polymerase.)

Identifiers
- Symbol: Bunya_RdRp
- Pfam: PF04196
- InterPro: IPR007322
Available protein structures:
- PDB: IPR007322 PF04196 (ECOD; PDBsum)
- AlphaFold: IPR007322; PF04196

== Viruses ==
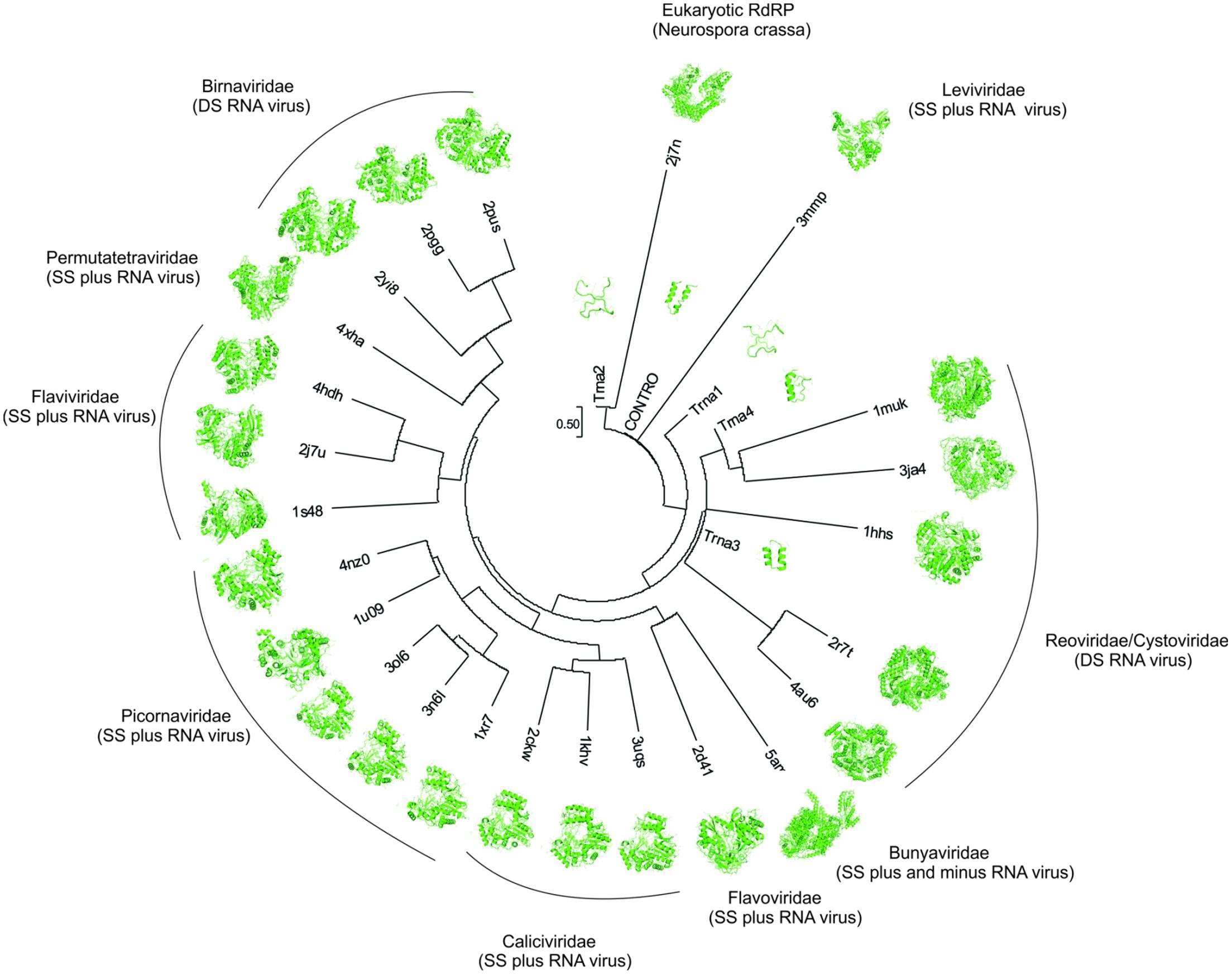
Structure and evolution of RdRp in RNA viruses and their superfamilies

Four superfamilies of viruses cover all RNA-containing viruses with no DNA stage:

- Viruses containing positive-strand RNA or double-strand RNA, except retroviruses and Birnaviridae
  - All positive-strand RNA eukaryotic viruses with no DNA stage, such as Coronaviridae
  - All RNA-containing bacteriophages; the two families of RNA-containing bacteriophages are Fiersviridae (positive ssRNA phages) and Cystoviridae (dsRNA phages)
  - dsRNA virus family Reoviridae, Totiviridae, Hypoviridae, Partitiviridae
- Mononegavirales (negative-strand RNA viruses with non-segmented genomes; InterPro: IPR016269)
- Negative-strand RNA viruses with segmented genomes (InterPro: IPR007099), such as orthomyxoviruses and bunyaviruses
- dsRNA virus family Birnaviridae (InterPro: IPR007100)

Flaviviruses produce a polyprotein from the ssRNA genome. The polyprotein is cleaved to a number of products, one of which is NS5, an RdRp. It possesses short regions and motifs homologous to other RdRps.

RNA replicase found in positive-strand ssRNA viruses are related to each other, forming three large superfamilies. Birnaviral RNA replicase is unique in that it lacks motif C (GDD) in the palm. Mononegaviral RdRp (PDB 5A22) has been automatically classified as similar to (+)−ssRNA RdRps, specifically one from Pestivirus and one from Leviviridae. Bunyaviral RdRp monomer (PDB 5AMQ) resembles the heterotrimeric complex of Orthomyxoviral (Influenza; PDB 4WSB) RdRp.

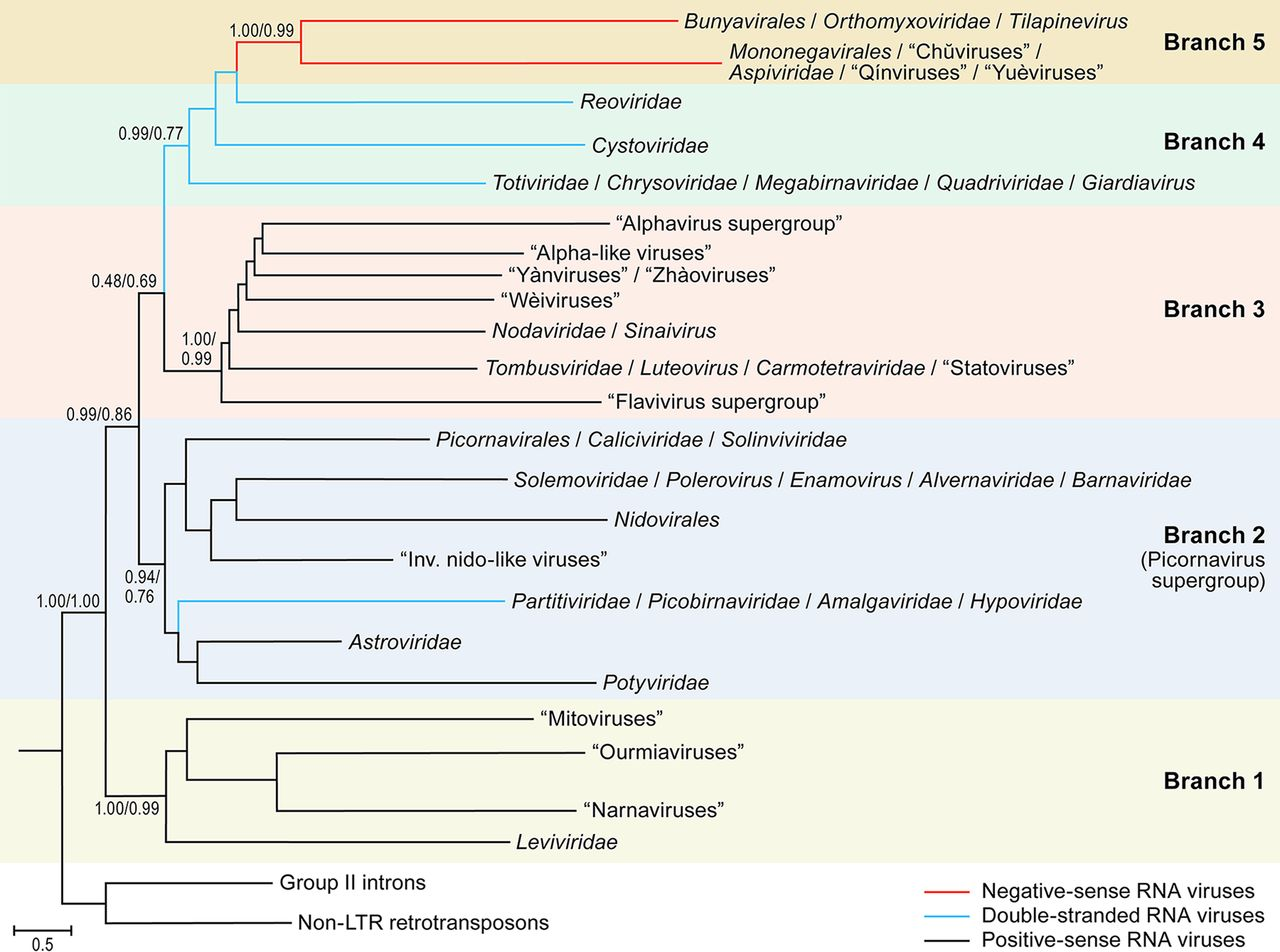
2018 phylogenetic tree with phylum branches highlighted. Negarnaviricota (brown), Duplornaviricota (green), Kitrinoviricota (pink), Pisuviricota (blue), and Lenarviricota (yellow)

Since it is a protein universal to RNA-containing viruses, RdRp is a useful marker for understanding their evolution. The RdRP-bearing viruses are united into the taxon Orthornavirae.

=== Recombination ===
When replicating its (+)ssRNA genome, the poliovirus RdRp is able to carry out recombination. Recombination appears to occur by a copy choice mechanism in which the RdRp switches (+)ssRNA templates during negative strand synthesis. Recombination frequency is determined in part by the fidelity of RdRp replication. RdRp variants with high replication fidelity show reduced recombination, and low fidelity RdRps exhibit increased recombination. Recombination by RdRp strand switching occurs frequently during replication in the (+)ssRNA plant carmoviruses and tombusviruses.

=== Intragenic complementation ===
Sendai virus (family Paramyxoviridae) has a linear, single-stranded, negative-sense, nonsegmented RNA genome. The viral RdRp consists of two virus-encoded subunits, a smaller one P and a larger one L. Testing different inactive RdRp mutants with defects throughout the length of the L subunit in pairwise combinations, restoration of viral RNA synthesis was observed in some combinations. This positive L–L interaction is referred to as intragenic complementation and indicates that the L protein is an oligomer in the viral RNA polymerase complex.

== Drug therapies ==
- RdRps can be used as drug targets for viral pathogens as their function is not necessary for eukaryotic survival. By inhibiting RdRp function, new RNAs cannot be replicated from an RNA template strand, however, DNA-dependent RNA polymerase remains functional.
- Some antiviral drugs against Hepatitis C and COVID-19 specifically target RdRp. These include Sofosbuvir and Ribavirin against Hepatitis C and remdesivir, an FDA approved drug against COVID-19
- GS-441524 triphosphate is a substrate for RdRp, but not mammalian polymerases. It results in premature chain termination and inhibition of viral replication. GS-441524 triphosphate is the biologically active form of remdesivir. Remdesivir is classified as a nucleotide analog that inhibits RdRp function by covalently binding to and interrupting termination of the nascent RNA through early or delayed termination or preventing further elongation of the RNA polynucleotide. This early termination leads to nonfunctional RNA that gets degraded through normal cellular processes.
- Baloxavir marboxil is an approved drug for the treatment of influenza infection. In addition, suraxavir marboxil and tivoxavir marboxil are currently undergoing clinical trials for the same indication. The development of an other inhibitor pimodivir, has been halted.

== RNA interference ==
The use of RdRp plays a major role in RNA interference in eukaryotes, a process used to silence gene expression via small interfering RNAs (siRNAs) binding to mRNA rendering them inactive. Eukaryotic RdRp becomes active in the presence of dsRNA, and is less widely distributed than other RNAi components as it lost in some animals, though still found in C. elegans, P. tetraurelia, and plants. This presence of dsRNA triggers the activation of RdRp and RNAi processes by priming the initiation of RNA transcription through the introduction of siRNAs. In C. elegans, siRNAs are integrated into the RNA-induced silencing complex, RISC, which works alongside mRNAs targeted for interference to recruit more RdRps to synthesize more secondary siRNAs and repress gene expression.

== See also ==
- Spiegelman's Monster
- NS5B inhibitor
