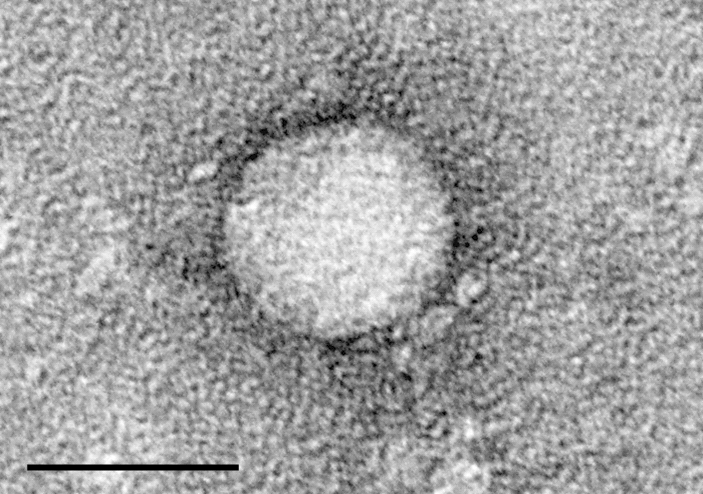
- Hepatitis C virus

Virus classification
- Group: Group IV ((+)ssRNA)

Kingdom: Phylum: Class
- Orthornavirae; Kitrinoviricota; Lenarviricota; Pisuviricota; Pisoniviricetes; Stelpaviricetes

Synonyms
- Positive-sense RNA virus

= Positive-strand RNA virus =

Class of viruses in the Baltimore classification

Positive-strand RNA viruses (+ssRNA viruses) are a group of related viruses that have positive-sense, single-stranded genomes made of ribonucleic acid. The positive-sense genome can act as messenger RNA (mRNA) and can be directly translated into viral proteins by the host cell's ribosomes. Positive-strand RNA viruses encode an RNA-dependent RNA polymerase (RdRp) which is used during replication of the genome to synthesize a negative-sense antigenome that is then used as a template to create a new positive-sense viral genome.

Positive-strand RNA viruses are divided between the phyla Kitrinoviricota, Lenarviricota, and Pisuviricota (specifically classes Pisoniviricetes and Stelpavirictes) all of which are in the kingdom Orthornavirae and realm Riboviria. They are monophyletic and descended from a common RNA virus ancestor. In the Baltimore classification system, +ssRNA viruses belong to Group IV.

Positive-sense RNA viruses include pathogens such as the Hepatitis C virus, West Nile virus, dengue virus, and the MERS, SARS, and SARS-CoV-2 coronaviruses, as well as less clinically serious pathogens such as the coronaviruses and rhinoviruses that cause the common cold.

== Genome ==
Positive-strand RNA virus genomes usually contain relatively few genes, usually between three and ten, including an RNA-dependent RNA polymerase. Coronaviruses have the largest known RNA genomes, between 27 and 32 kilobases in length, and likely possess replication proofreading mechanisms in the form of an exoribonuclease within nonstructural protein nsp14.

== Replication ==
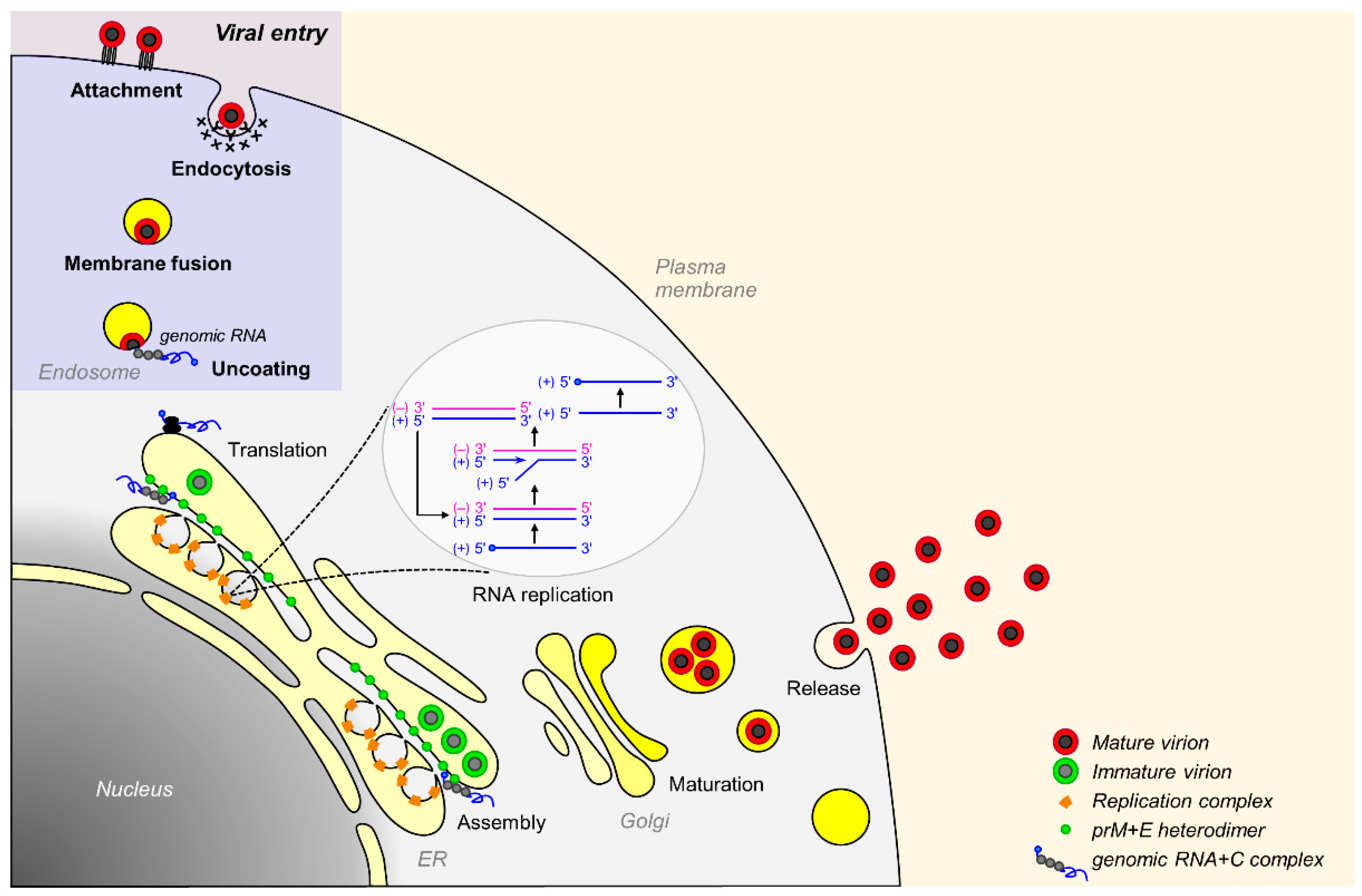
Life cycle of Japanese encephalitis virus a +ssRNA virus: attachment, endocytosis, membrane fusion, uncoating, translation, RNA replication, assembly, maturation, and release.

Positive-strand RNA viruses have genetic material that can function both as a genome and as messenger RNA; it can be directly translated into protein in the host cell by host ribosomes. The first proteins to be expressed after infection serve genome replication functions; they recruit the positive-strand viral genome to viral replication complexes formed in association with intracellular membranes. These complexes contain proteins of both viral and host cell origin, and may be associated with the membranes of a variety of organelles—often the rough endoplasmic reticulum, but also including membranes derived from mitochondria, vacuoles, the Golgi apparatus, chloroplasts, peroxisomes, plasma membranes, autophagosomal membranes, and novel cytoplasmic compartments.

The replication of the positive-sense RNA genome proceeds through double-stranded RNA intermediates, and the purpose of replication in these membranous invaginations may be the avoidance of cellular response to the presence of dsRNA. In many cases subgenomic RNAs are also created during replication. After infection, the entirety of the host cell's translation machinery may be diverted to the production of viral proteins as a result of the very high affinity for ribosomes by the viral genome's internal ribosome entry site (IRES) elements; in some viruses, such as poliovirus and rhinoviruses, normal protein synthesis is further disrupted by viral proteases degrading components required to initiate translation of cellular mRNA.

All positive-strand RNA virus genomes encode RNA-dependent RNA polymerase, a viral protein that synthesizes RNA from an RNA template. Host cell proteins recruited by +ssRNA viruses during replication include RNA-binding proteins, chaperone proteins, and membrane remodeling and lipid synthesis proteins, which collectively participate in exploiting the cell's secretory pathway for viral replication.

== Recombination ==
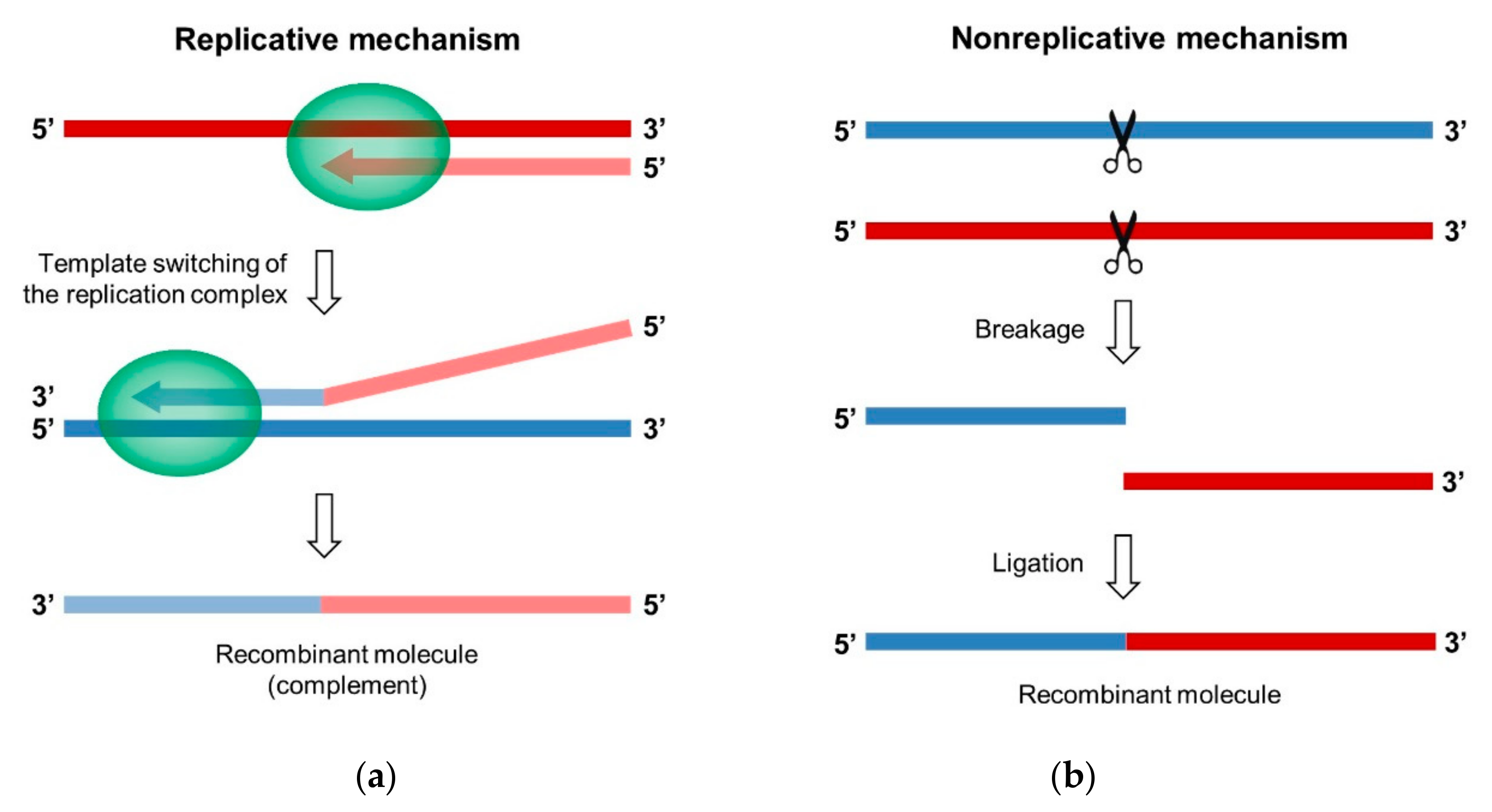
Mechanisms of replicative and nonreplicative RNA recombination.

Numerous positive-strand RNA viruses can undergo genetic recombination when at least two viral genomes are present in the same host cell. The capability for recombination among +ssRNA virus pathogens of humans is common. RNA recombination appears to be a major driving force in determining genome architecture and the course of viral evolution among Picornaviridae (e.g. poliovirus). In the Retroviridae (e.g. HIV), genome damage appears to be avoided during reverse transcription by strand switching, a form of recombination. Recombination occurs in the Coronaviridae (e.g. SARS). Recombination in RNA viruses appears to be an adaptation for coping with genome damage. Recombination can also occur infrequently between +ssRNA viruses of the same species but of divergent lineages. The resulting recombinant viruses may sometimes cause an outbreak of infection in humans, as in the case of SARS and MERS.

Positive-strand RNA viruses are common in plants. In tombusviruses and carmoviruses, RNA recombination occurs frequently during replication. The ability of the RNA-dependent RNA polymerase of these viruses to switch RNA templates suggests a copy choice model of RNA recombination that may be an adaptive mechanism for coping with damage in the viral genome. Other +ssRNA viruses of plants have also been reported to be capable of recombination, such as Brom mosaic bromovirus and Sindbis virus.

== Classification ==
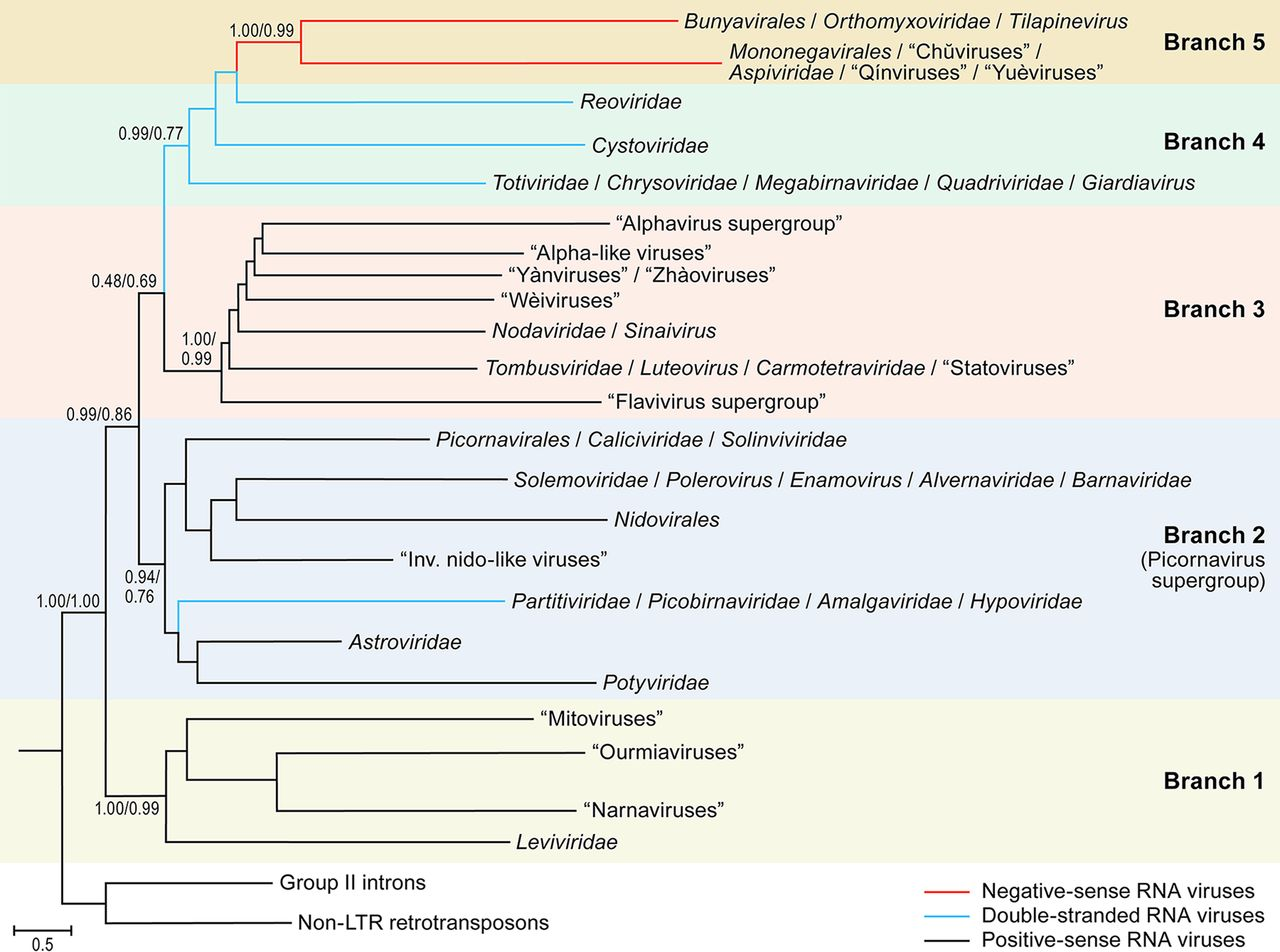
Phylogenetic tree with phylum branches highlighted. Negarnaviricota (brown), Duplornaviricota (green), Kitrinoviricota (pink), Pisuviricota (blue), and Lenarviricota (yellow).

Positive-strand RNA viruses are found in three phyla: Kitrinoviricota, Lenarviricota, and Pisuviricota, each of which are assigned to the kingdom Orthornavirae in the realm Riboviria. In the Baltimore classification system, which groups viruses together based on their manner of mRNA synthesis, +ssRNA viruses are group IV.

=== Kitrinoviricota ===
The first +ssRNA phylum is Kitrinoviricota. The phylum contains what have been referred to as the "alphavirus supergroup" and "flavivirus supergroup" along with various other short-genome viruses. Four classes in the phylum are recognized: Alsuviricetes, the alphavirus supergroup, which contains a large number of plant viruses and arthropod viruses; Flasuviricetes, which contains flaviviruses, Magsaviricetes, which contains nodaviruses and sinhaliviruses; and Tolucaviricetes, which primarily contains plant viruses.

=== Lenarviricota ===
Lenarviricota is the second +ssRNA phylum. It contains the class Leviviricetes, which infect prokaryotes, and the apparent descendants of leviviruses, which infect eukaryotes. The phylum is divided into four classes: Leviviricetes, which contains leviviruses and their relatives, Amabiliviricetes, which contains narnaviruses and their relatives, Howeltoviricetes, which contains mitoviruses and their relatives, and Miaviricetes, which contains botourmiaviruses and their relatives. Based on phylogenetic analysis of RdRp, all other RNA viruses are considered to comprise a sister clade in relation to Lenarviricota.

=== Pisuviricota ===
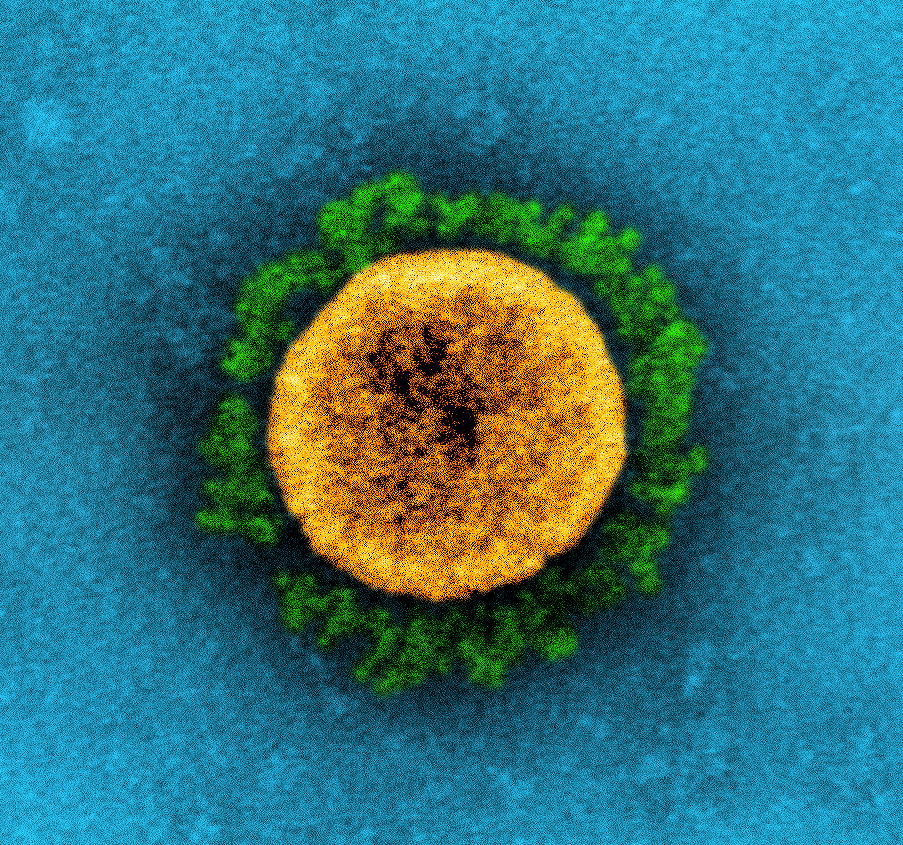
False-color Transmission electron micrograph of a SARS-CoV-2 virion. Coronaviruses like SARS-CoV-2 fall in the phylum Pisuviricota.

The third phylum that contains +ssRNA viruses is Pisuviricota, which has been informally called the "picornavirus supergroup". The phylum contains a large assemblage of eukaryotic viruses known to infect animals, plants, fungi, and protists. The phylum contains three classes, two of which contain only +ssRNA viruses: Pisoniviricetes, which contains nidoviruses, picornaviruses, and sobeliviruses, and Stelpaviricetes, which contains potyviruses and astroviruses. The third class is Duplopiviricetes, whose members are double-stranded RNA viruses that are descended from +ssRNA viruses.

== See also ==
- Double-stranded RNA virus
- Negative-strand RNA virus
- Sense (molecular biology)
