= Leviviricetes =

Virus classification
- (unranked): Virus
- Realm: Riboviria
- Kingdom: Orthornavirae
- Phylum: Lenarviricota
- Class: Leviviricetes

Class of viruses

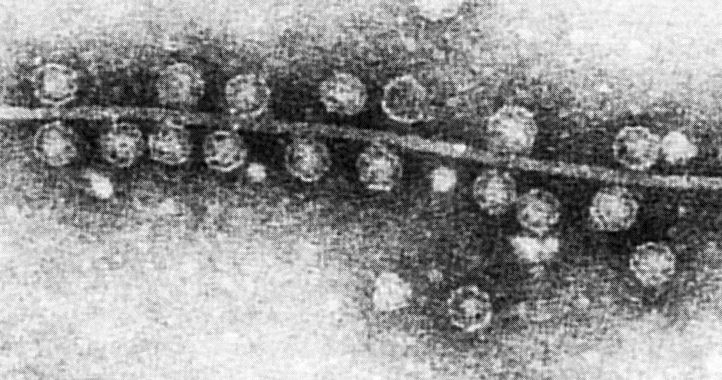
Transmission electron micrograph of the bacteriophage Qβ attached to sex pilus of the bacterium Escherichia coli

Leviviricetes is a class of viruses, which infect prokaryotes. Most of these bacteriophages were discovered by metagenomics.

== Taxonomy ==
Leviviricetes contains two orders and five genera unassigned to an order and family. This is shown hereafter:

Orders:

- Norzivirales
- Timlovirales

Unassigned genera:

- Grandbuvirus
- Mahrahvirus
- Nicedsevirus
- Nordovirus
- Skrubnovirus
