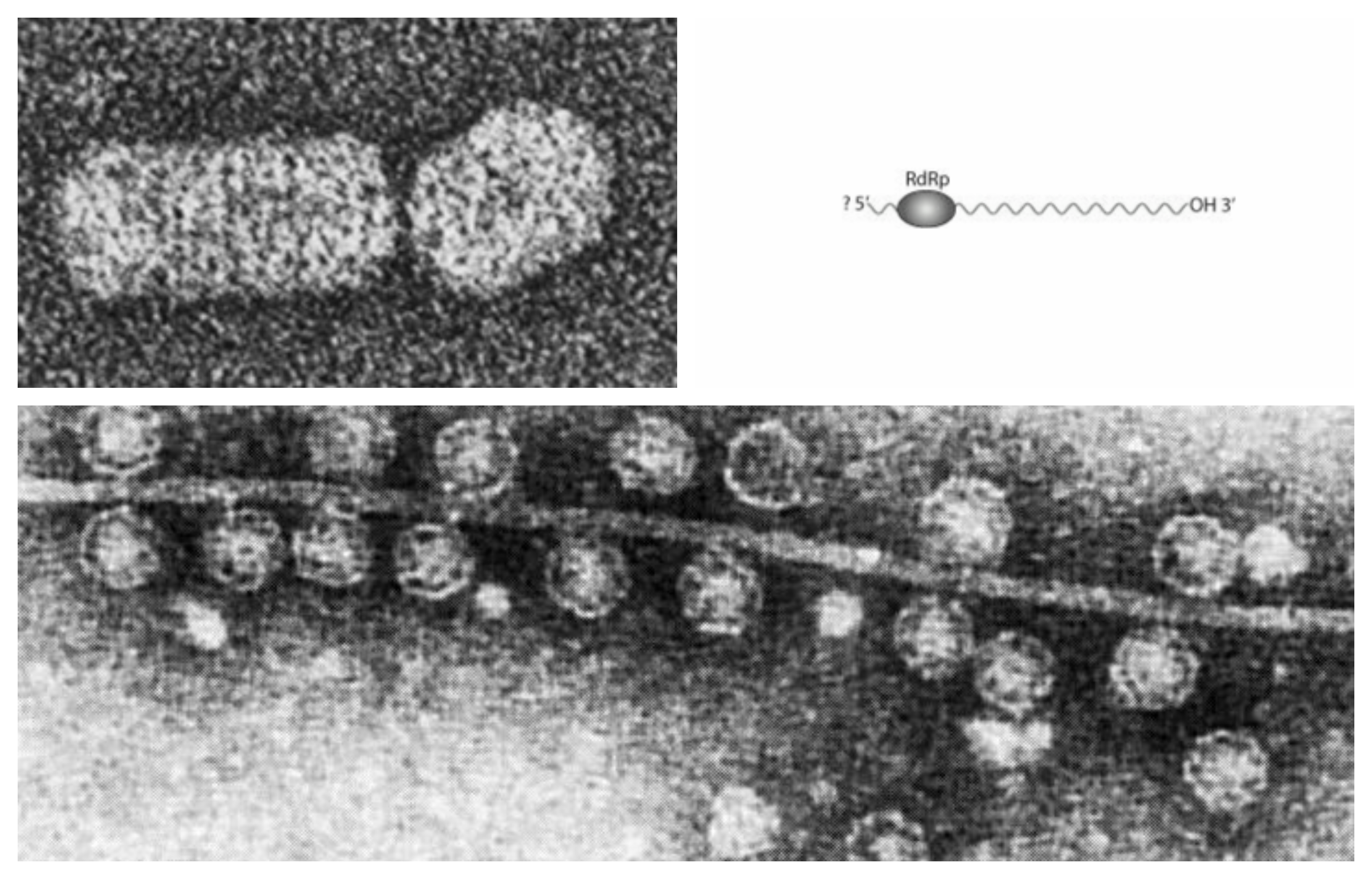
- TEMs of phylum Lenarviricota virions: Ourmia melon virus (left); narnaviruses and mitoviruses have no capsid or envelope (right); bacteriophages Qbeta attached to the pilus of E. coli (bottom)

Virus classification
- (unranked): Virus
- Realm: Riboviria
- Kingdom: Orthornavirae
- Phylum: Lenarviricota

Classes
- See text

= Lenarviricota =

Phylum of viruses

Lenarviricota is a phylum of RNA viruses that includes all positive-strand RNA viruses that infect prokaryotes. Some members also infect eukaryotes. Most of these viruses do not have capsids, except for the genus Ourmiavirus. The name of the group is a syllabic abbreviation of the names of founding member families "Leviviridae and Narnaviridae" with the suffix -viricota, denoting a virus phylum.

== Phylogenetics ==
Lenarviricota is the first branch of RNA viruses to emerge, since they are the most basal branch. Most of its members, the leviviruses (class Leviviricetes), only infect prokaryotes, and their known level of diversity has grown dramatically in recent years, which suggests that the RNA viruses may be more widespread in prokaryotes than previously believed.

It has been suggested that the origin of Lenarviricota may predate that of the last universal common ancestor (LUCA). Lenarviricota viruses appear to have arisen from a primordial RdRP of the RNA-protein world that gave rise to leviviruses (class Leviviricetes). It has also been suggested that the retroelements of cellular life (group II introns and retrotransposons) evolved from a shared ancestor with Lenarviricota.

The eukaryotic RNA viruses without capsids, Mitoviridae, Narnaviridae and Botourmiaviridae, arose from the leviviruses with the loss of the capsid during the time that eukaryogenesis occurred, when the bacterial endosymbiont became the mitochondria. The genus Ourmiavirus arose by recombination between a non-capsid botourmiavirus and a virus from the family Tombusviridae, which inherited its capsid proteins.

== Taxonomy ==
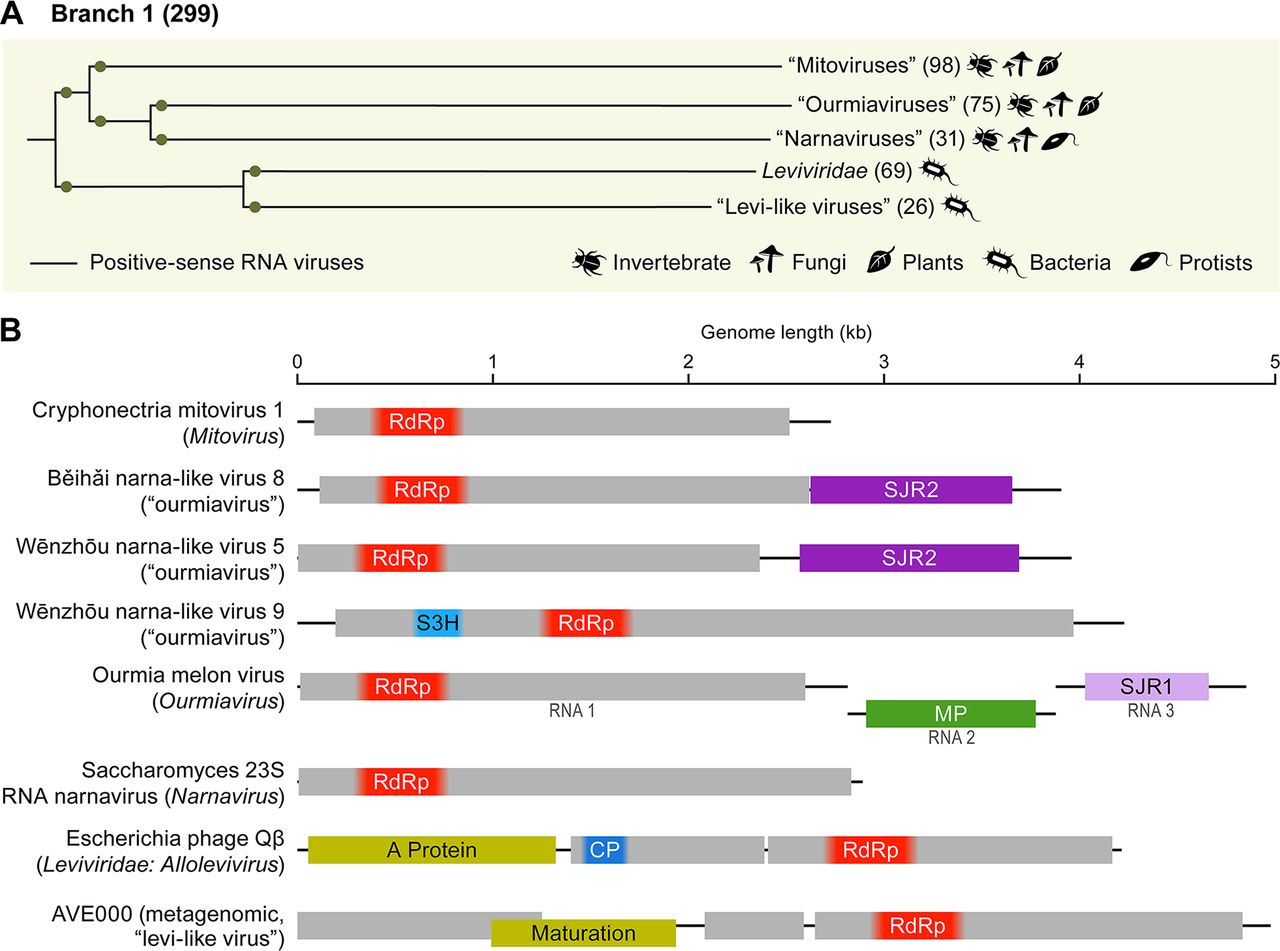
Phylogenetic tree of Lenarviricota (top), genome of different members and major conserved proteins (bottom)

The following classes are recognized:

- Amabiliviricetes
- Howeltoviricetes
- Leviviricetes
- Miaviricetes
