= Ekpoma virus =

Ekpoma viruses

Scientific classification
- (unranked): Virus
- Realm: Riboviria
- Kingdom: Orthornavirae
- Phylum: Negarnaviricota
- Class: Monjiviricetes
- Order: Mononegavirales
- Family: Rhabdoviridae
- Subfamily: Alpharhabdovirinae
- Genus: Tibrovirus

Groups included
- Ekpoma 1 tibrovirus; Ekpoma 2 tibrovirus

Cladistically included but traditionally excluded taxa
- Bas-Congo tibrovirus; Beatrice Hill tibrovirus; Coastal Plains tibrovirus; Sweetwater Branch tibrovirus; Tibrogargan tibrovirus

Orphan RNA viruses in humans

Ekpoma viruses, including Ekpoma 1 tibrovirus (EKV-1) and Ekpoma 2 tibrovirus (EKV-2), are orphan viruses not associated with any disease. They are negative-sense RNA viruses and members of the rhabdovirus family. Both viruses were discovered in 2015 in blood samples collected from two healthy women living in Ekpoma, Nigeria. EKV-2 appears to be widespread and ~45% of people living in and around Ekpoma have been previously exposed. Both viruses have very broad cellular tropism and the ability to infect a wide range of human cancer cell lines. Neither virus has been isolated, hindering research.

== Discovery ==
EKV-1 and EKV-2 were discovered in plasma samples from a 45-year-old female and in a 19-year-old female, respectively. Neither woman presented with any indication of illness and according to a 2015 report, the samples were collected as controls in a larger metagenomics study. The viruses were identified using next-generation sequencing.

== Clinical Disease ==
EKV-1 and EKV-2 are orphan viruses not associated with any disease. According to the 2015 report, the woman infected with EKV-1 could not recall any episode of illness in the weeks or months following the collection of her sample. The woman infected with EKV-2 recalled a fever that occurred several weeks after the sample collection. She was diagnosed and treated for malaria.

== Viremia ==
The titers of viremia observed in the women ranged from 45,000 RNA copies/mL plasma (EKV-2) to 4.5 million RNA copies/mL plasma (EKV-1).

== Prevalence ==
Researchers used an enzyme-linked immunosorbent assay (ELISA) to detect antibodies that recognize the nucleocapsid protein of EKV-1/2. They reported that 5% of people living in and around Ekpoma had been exposed to EKV-1 and 45% to EKV-2.

== Transmission ==
The natural reservoir and mode of transmission for EKV-1/2 are not known. Based on the natural reservoir and vector for other tibroviruses, researchers have hypothesized that biting midges may transmit the viruses to humans.

== Genome ==
The published genomes of EKV-1 and EKV-2 are not complete. However, based on the sequence available, the genome contains the typical five open reading frames present in all rhabdoviruses (N, P, M, G, and L). The viruses also include three open reading frames of unknown function (U1, U2 and U3). U3 has been hypothesized to be a viroporin based on sequence similarity to other viroporins.

== Genetic divergence ==
Although EKV-1 and EKV-2 were discovered in the same village in southwestern Nigeria, they only share 33% overall homology at the amino acid level.

One notable difference between the two viruses is in the length of the phosphoprotein (P). The EKV-1 phosphoprotein contains 115 more amino acids than the EKV-2 phosphoprotein.

Also notable are the differences in the envelope glycoprotein. The EKV-1 and EKV-2 envelop glycoproteins are only 27% identical at the amino acid level.

== Replication ==
The EKV-1 and EKV-2 cellular receptors have not been identified. However, tropism of EKV-1 and EKV-2 has been studied using recombinant vesicular stomatitis virus (VSV) that express the EKV-1 or EKV-2 glycoproteins. VSV particles that express the EKV-1 and EKV-2 glycoproteins outperform the native VSV glycoprotein. These particles are able to enter a wide range of human and non-human cells.

The steps in the replication lifecycle after particle entry have not been elucidated.
