= Adelaide River virus =

Virus classification
- (unranked): Virus
- Realm: Riboviria
- Kingdom: Orthornavirae
- Phylum: Negarnaviricota
- Class: Monjiviricetes
- Order: Mononegavirales
- Family: Rhabdoviridae
- Genus: Ephemerovirus
- Species: Ephemerovirus adelaide

Synonyms
- Adelaide River ephemerovirus

Species of virus

Adelaide River virus (ARV) is a negative-sense single-stranded RNA virus of the family Rhabdoviridae. The virus's primary hosts are all bovine, including domestic water buffalo, and cape buffalo.

The nucleotide sequence of the ARV genome was derived from the 3` terminus to the end of the nucleoprotein gene.
