= Artemvirus bsafivalis =

Virus classification
- (unranked): Virus
- Realm: Riboviria
- Kingdom: Orthornavirae
- Phylum: Negarnaviricota
- Class: Monjiviricetes
- Order: Mononegavirales
- Family: Lispiviridae
- Genus: Artemvirus
- Species: Artemvirus bsafivalis

Species of virus

Artemvirus bsafivalis is a negative-strand RNA virus in the genus Artemvirus.
