= Chandipura virus =

Virus classification
- (unranked): Virus
- Realm: Riboviria
- Kingdom: Orthornavirae
- Phylum: Negarnaviricota
- Class: Monjiviricetes
- Order: Mononegavirales
- Family: Rhabdoviridae
- Genus: Vesiculovirus
- Species: Vesiculovirus chandipura

Synonyms
- Chandipura vesiculovirus

Species of virus

Chandipura virus (CHPV) is a rhabdovirus that can cause acute encephalitis syndrome in humans, particularly in [24]children. The virus was first identified in 1965 after being isolated from two patients with febrile illness in Chandipura village, Maharashtra, India. It has since caused sporadic cases and outbreaks of acute encephalitis syndrome in several regions of India. Transmitted primarily by sandflies, CHPV has also been isolated from sandflies in parts of Africa. Management is supportive, as no specific antiviral treatment or licensed vaccine for CHPV currently exists.

== Etymology ==
The virus is named after Chandipura, a village in Maharashtra, India where it was first identified.

== Virology ==
Chandipura virus is an enveloped (-)ssRNA virus with an approximate genome length of ~11 kb. The viral genome encodes five proteins, namely, nucleocapsid protein N, phosphoprotein P, matrix protein M, glycoprotein G and large protein L in five monocistronic mRNAs. N protein encapsidates genome RNA into a nuclease-resistant form to protect it from cellular RNAse activity. L and P protein together form viral RNA dependent RNA polymerase; where catalytic functions for RNA polymerization, capping and poly-A polymerase reside within the L protein and P acts as a transcriptional activator. Matrix protein glues the encapsidated genome RNA, also known as nucleocapsid, with the outer membrane envelope. G protein spikes out of the membrane and acts as a major antigenic determinant.

The viral lifecycle is cytosolic. During transcription, viral polymerase synthesizes five discrete mRNAs and terminates at stop signals present at the gene boundaries. Accumulation of adequate amounts of viral proteins within infected cells through viral transcription and subsequent translation potentiate the onset of viral replicative cycle. In this phase, some L protein acts as a replicase and ignore the gene junctions to generate a polycistronic anti-genomic analogue that acts as a template for further rounds of replication to generate many more copies of the genome RNA. This progeny genome RNA upon packaging by viral proteins bud out as mature virus particles. As of 2007, the precise mechanism underlying the switch in polymerase function during viral replication remained unknown.

== Epidemiology ==
Chandipura virus is transmitted by sandflies, mosquitoes, and ticks. Experimentally CHPV has been transmitted in Phlebotomus papatasi sand flies and Aedes aegypti mosquitoes. The ultimate reservoir is unknown. Human-to-human transmission is not known to occur.

Geographically, Chandipura virus human infections so far have been described only in central India; however the World Health Organization suspects it could be found in other Asian or African countries, as CHPV has been isolated from wild sandflies in Africa. The presence of the virus in Africa indicates a wide distribution.

Past outbreaks occurred during extremely high ambient temperatures of 36–49 °C. The 2024 outbreak correlates with exceptional rains and 2024 India floods where pools of water are breeding grounds for the insect vector, and lack of sanitation, lack of waste management or open sewerage.

== Infection ==
Chandipura virus infection
- Specialty: Infectious disease
- Symptoms: high fever, convulsion, confusion, diarrhea, vomiting, headache, unconsciousness, coma
- Complications: Chandipura viral encephalitis
- Causes: Chandipura virus
- Treatment: Supportive care
- Medication: Incurable

=== Signs and symptoms ===
Symptoms of Chandipura virus infection typically include fever, muscle aches and headache.

A high seroprevalence of neutralising antibodies in the healthy population has been found. Therefore, most infections must be subclinical or mild. The lowest seroprevalence in the healthy population was in children under five (44%), 76% in those over five, and 97% in adults.

The complicated course with brain infection includes convulsions and unconsciousness, progressing rapidly to coma and in severe cases to death.

There has been a discussion in the scientific community as to whether the CNS infection should be termed encephalitis or febrile encephalopathy or vasculitis-associated cerebral infarction, hence WHO uses the broader term "encephalitis syndrome". In past outbreak studies cerebrospinal fluid analyses were normal. CNS imaging showed brain edema due to middle cerebral artery infarction or vasospasm, with endothelial damage being the result of encephalitis. CNS imaging has also shown hypodense cortical areas in the frontal and temporal lobes.

The case-fatality rate of untreated encephalitis syndrome is 56–75%, but early treatment of raised intracranial pressure reduces the fatality rate. Of 27 children surviving encephalitis syndrome, 24 completely recovered within 3 months, only two developed late-onset refractory epilepsy and four continued to have hemiplegia after 8 months.

=== Diagnosis ===
Diagnosis of Chandipura virus infection is confirmed with immunoglobulin M enzyme-linked immunosorbent assay (IgM ELISA) or reverse transcription polymerase chain reaction (RT-PCR).

=== Prevention and treatment ===
No specific treatment or vaccine is available for Chandipura virus infection, so management focuses on supportive care and prevention measures such as mosquito control.

== Outbreaks ==
Between June and August 2003, 329 children contracted the virus, and 183 died in Andhra Pradesh and Maharashtra states of India. Further sporadic cases and deaths in children were observed in Gujarat state in 2004. In 2009, there were 52 positive cases, and 15 fatalities in Maharashtra. In 2010, there were 50 positive cases and 16 fatalities during an outbreak in Gujarat in Kheda District, Vadodara District, and Panchmahal District.Sandfly bites were blamed for the outbreak, as they inhabit cracks in walls or parts of homes made of sand or mud. Sporadic cases appeared in Gujarat in 2014 and 2016. In 2016, a girl from Ahmedabad succumbed to the virus. In 2019, another girl from Bhayli, Vadodara succumbed to the virus.

Throughout July 2024, the largest outbreak so far occurred, particularly affecting children in the Sabarkantha district of Gujarat. The outbreak raised public health concerns due to the rapid spread and the severity of symptoms observed. According to a July 29 report, 38 deaths caused by the virus had been confirmed, and there remained a speculative death toll of 48.
