= Spring viraemia of carp =

Spring viremia of carp virus

Virus classification
- (unranked): Virus
- Realm: Riboviria
- Kingdom: Orthornavirae
- Phylum: Negarnaviricota
- Class: Monjiviricetes
- Order: Mononegavirales
- Family: Rhabdoviridae
- Genus: Sprivivirus
- Species: Sprivivirus cyprinus

Synonyms
- Carp sprivivirus

Viral disease of fish

Spring viraemia of carp, also known as swim bladder inflammation, is caused by Spring viremia of carp virus (Sprivivirus cyprinus). It is listed as a notifiable disease under the World Organisation for Animal Health.

== Impacted species ==
Spring viraemia of carp virus has been shown to infect a wide variety of fish species including silver carp, grass carp, crucian carp, and bighead carp. It has also been shown experimentally to infect other fish species including northern pike, guppies, zebrafish, and pumpkinseed. It is considered to be a major threat to native fish populations, especially farmed fish including ornamental koi and common carp.

== Pathology ==
Clinical symptoms of viral infection include external hemorrhaging, pale gills, and ascites. In some cases, mortality can occur without any apparent clinical signs of the disease. The virus has been found in high concentrations in the liver and kidney, but lower numbers of virions have been isolated from the spleen. The virus has been shown to persist subclinically in fish populations up to 10 weeks following experimental infection. Currently efforts have been made to prevent infection by the virus through the development of DNA vaccines and immunostimulatory therapeutics.

== Prevalence ==
The virus has been implicated in several outbreaks of SVC throughout the past few decades. Originally the range of the virus was isolated to Europe and the Middle East. In 2002 it was isolated from a North Carolina lake. In 2004 the virus was isolated from imported koi in Cedar Lake, Wisconsin. Additionally, the virus has been linked to an outbreak of SVC in 2006 at Hamilton Bay in Lake Ontario.
