= Bovine ephemeral fever =

Bovine ephemeral fever virus

Virus classification
- (unranked): Virus
- Realm: Riboviria
- Kingdom: Orthornavirae
- Phylum: Negarnaviricota
- Class: Monjiviricetes
- Order: Mononegavirales
- Family: Rhabdoviridae
- Genus: Ephemerovirus
- Species: Ephemerovirus febris

Synonyms
- Bovine fever ephemerovirus; Bovine fever virus

Viral disease of cattle

Bovine ephemeral fever (BEF) also known as Three Day Sickness is an arthropod vector-borne disease of cattle and is caused by bovine ephemeral fever virus (BEFV), a member of the genus Ephemerovirus in the family Rhabdoviridae.

== Virology ==
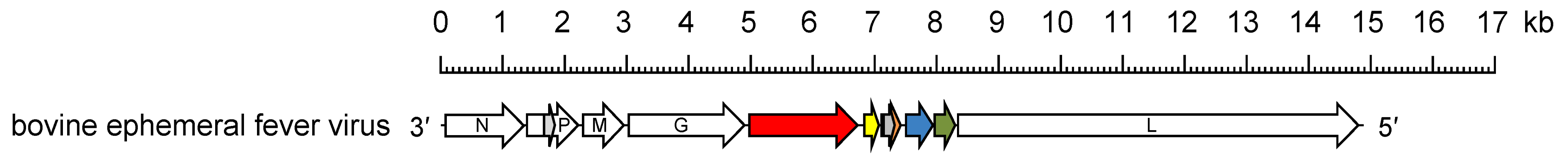
Genome of BEFV

BEFV forms a bullet- or cone-shaped virions that consist of a negative, single stranded RNA genome with a lipid envelope and 5 structural proteins. The envelope glycoprotein G contains type-specific and neutralizing antigenic sites. There has been recent evidence which demonstrated that BEFV induces apoptosis in several cell lines. It was however shown that apoptosis could be blocked by the caspase inhibitor (Z-VAD-fmk), indicating that BEFV induces caspase-dependent apoptosis in cultured cells.

== Location ==
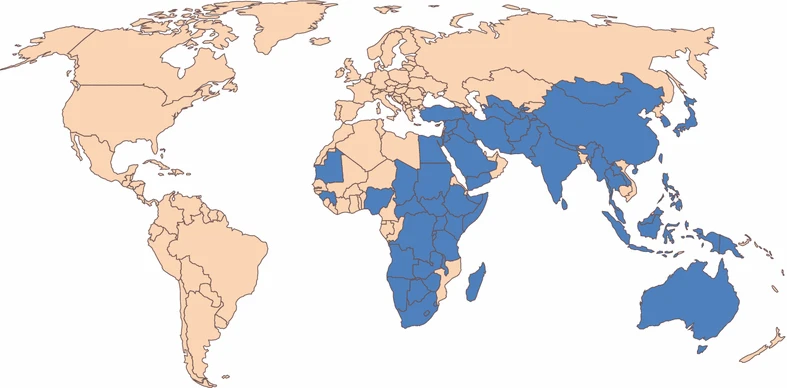
Countries in blue are where bovine ephemeral fever has been reported

The virus has been found in tropical and subtropical regions of Asia, Africa and through eastern Australia. It is not found in the Americas, or in Europe (except western parts of Turkey).

== Transmission ==
The virus is transmitted by an insect vector. The particular species linked to the virus are the biting midges Culicoides oxystoma and C. nipponensis.

== Disease characteristics ==
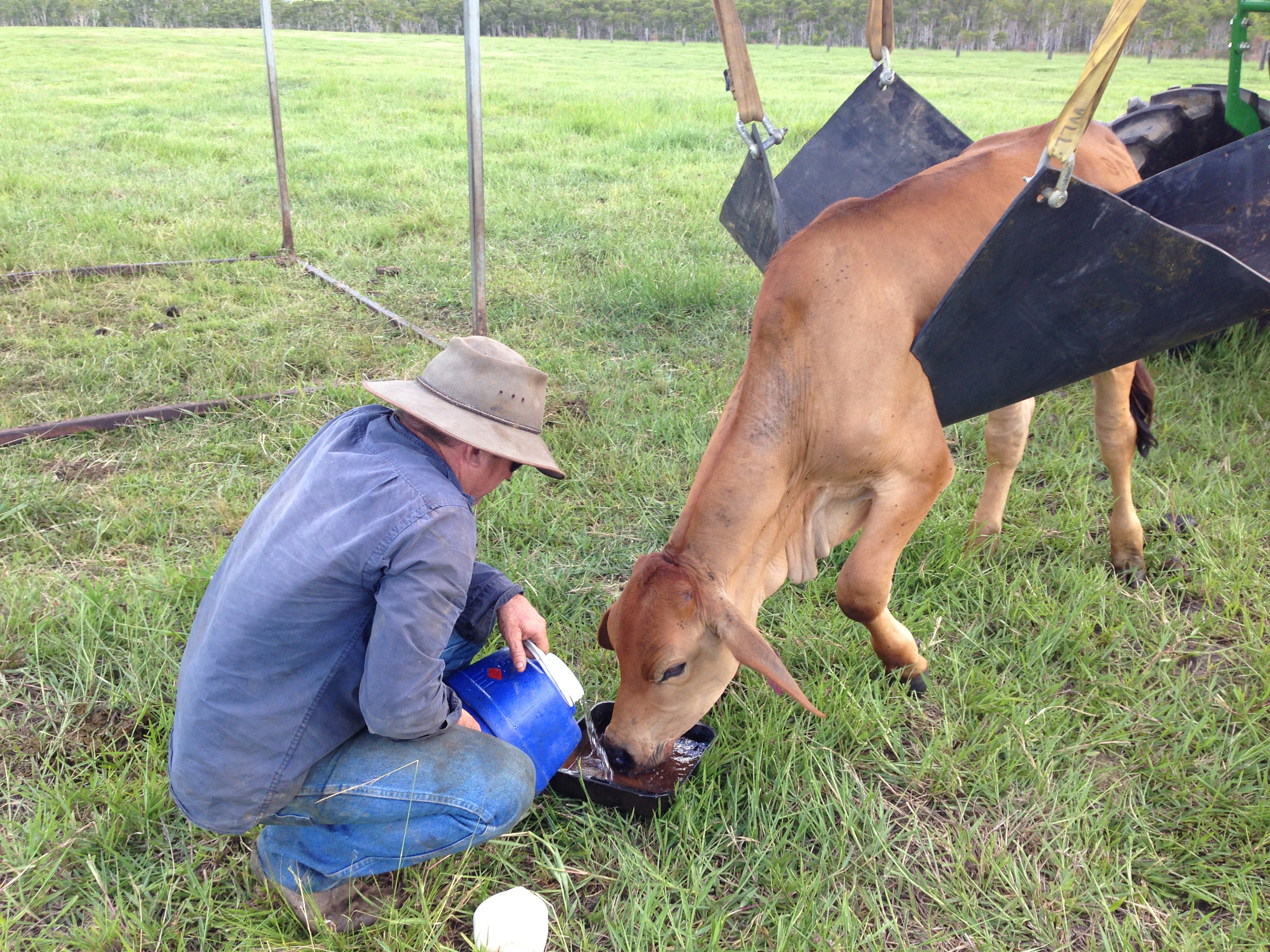
Animal with BEF: hoisting the animal prevents loss of circulation and muscle damage.

The characteristics of the disease are the sudden onset of fever, stiffness, lameness and nasal and ocular discharges. BEF often causes hypocalcaemia which in turn generates clinical signs such as depression, cessation of rumination, muscle tremors and constipation.

Although the pathogenesis of the disease is complex it seems clear that the host inflammatory responses, mediated by the release of cytokines, are involved in the expression of the disease.

== Diagnosis ==
The virus can be isolated from blood and can be identified by immunofluorescence and immunostaining. Rising levels of antibodies in two samples taken 2 to 4 weeks apart also indicate infection.

== Treatment ==
Rest, and lack of stress, are important to aid recovery. Animals lying flat out on their side, unable to get up, should be rolled over several times each day to prevent loss of circulation and muscle damage. If the animal has signs of hypocalcemia, such as rumen stasis, then calcium borogluconate may be administered. Non-steroidal anti-inflammatory drugs can improve recovery. Rest is absolutely imperative, for a minimum of one week or death can still occur.

== Control ==
A vaccine is available in Japan but is very expensive which limits its use. Movement regulations are in place in several countries. Ultravac BEF (from Zoetis) - is a vaccine to prevent bovine ephemeral fever. The product is registered in Australia, Israel and Egypt.
