= Hart Park virus =

Virus classification
- (unranked): Virus
- Realm: Riboviria
- Kingdom: Orthornavirae
- Phylum: Negarnaviricota
- Class: Monjiviricetes
- Order: Mononegavirales
- Family: Rhabdoviridae
- Genus: Hapavirus
- Species: Hart Park hapavirus

Species of virus

Hart Park virus, or HP virus, is a single-stranded RNA arbovirus that is primarily transmitted through mosquitoes. The HP virus is classified in the Rhabdoviridae family and is related to the viral agents that cause rabies and vesicular stomatitis. The exact date of discovery of this virus is uncertain, but its presence in the entomological community dates back as far as 1964. Because of its relatively recent discovery, its exact effect on hosts is uncertain. Currently, there is no known disease affiliated with the Hart Park virus.

== Transmission ==
The western encephalitis mosquito, or Culex tarsalis, is one of the common mosquito vectors for the HP virus because of its prevalence in North America. Wild birds are the most frequent host of the HP virus because they are the target of blood-feeding Cx. tarsalis mosquitoes. Female Cx. tarsalis mosquitoes primarily feed on birds but in late summer, their blood feeding on larger mammals such as man increases. The host transition from birds to humans plays a huge role in the potential for widespread viral infections of the HP virus and similar strains. One important find from recent studies, is that the HP virus seems unable to be transmitted transovarially from infected females to their offspring. This restricts the direct spread of the virus because the progeny do not inherit the Hart Park virus from their maternal parent. The Hart Park virus does not currently have a disease related to its infection in other animals, but its transmission through feral birds is a cause for concern.

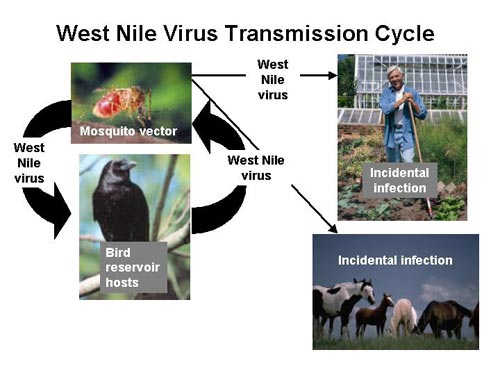
The West Nile virus transmission cycle is similar to the putative Hart Park virus transmission cycle.

== Symptoms ==
Symptoms specific to the HP virus in humans have not been conclusive, however; symptoms of RNA viruses include: hepatitis, encephalitis, mild fever, and hemorrhagic fever. The primary hosts for the HP virus are wild birds. This make it harder to distinguish the warning signs of a possible HP infection.

== Flanders virus ==
The Flanders virus is similar to the antigentic make-up of the Hart Park virus. Both the HP and Flanders viruses are part of the Rhabdoviridae family and are both agents of Culex mosquitoes. The Flanders virus was named after the town in which it was first discovered in 1960. This town, in New York is a hamlet that provides the ideal habitat for mosquitoes because of its relatively long coastline. The access to large standing bodies of water are perfect nesting grounds for the Culex mosquitoes to begin laying eggs, away from potential predators. Similarly, the Flanders virus typically infects wild birds. The primary targets of the Flanders virus are red-winged blackbirds, house sparrows, and starlings.

== Prevention ==
The routine prevention technique practiced by experts is isolation from potentially infected organisms, primarily feral birds and mosquitoes. It remains unclear whether the HP virus can spread to a new host posthumously, but professionals advise to avoid any deceased animals found in the wild. Mosquitoes pose a constant threat toward the transmission of the HP virus due to their wide range of hosts.
