= Madalivirus =

Virus classification
- (unranked): Virus
- Realm: Riboviria
- Kingdom: Orthornavirae
- Phylum: Negarnaviricota
- Class: Monjiviricetes
- Order: Mononegavirales
- Family: Xinmoviridae
- Genus: Madalivirus

Genus of viruses

Madalivirus is a genus of viruses in the family Xinmoviridae.

== Species ==
The genus contains the following species:

- Madalivirus amapaense
- Madalivirus amazonaense
