= Tupavirus =

Virus classification
- (unranked): Virus
- Realm: Riboviria
- Kingdom: Orthornavirae
- Phylum: Negarnaviricota
- Class: Monjiviricetes
- Order: Mononegavirales
- Family: Rhabdoviridae
- Subfamily: Alpharhabdovirinae
- Genus: Tupavirus

Species
- See text

Genus of viruses

Tupavirus is a genus of viruses in the family Rhabdoviridae, order Mononegavirales.

== Taxonomy ==
The genus contains the following species, listed by scientific name and followed by the exemplar virus of the species:

- Tupavirus delphini, Dolphin tupavirus
- Tupavirus durham, Durham virus
- Tupavirus incomtus, Tupavirus SB8301
- Tupavirus klamath, Klamath virus
- Tupavirus laniger, Wenzhou Myotis laniger tupavirus 1
- Tupavirus pearsonii, Wufeng Rhinolophus pearsonii tupavirus 1
- Tupavirus stheno, Bat tupavirus BS1
- Tupavirus stoliczkanus, Bat tupavirus BS2
- Tupavirus tupaia, Tupaia rhabdovirus
- Tupavirus wufeng, Wufeng bat tupavirus 2

== Structure ==
Tupavirus virions are enveloped, with bullet shaped geometries. These particles are about 160 nm long. Tupavirus genomes are linear, around 11.2 kb in length. The genome codes for 7 proteins.

| Genus | Structure | Symmetry | Capsid | Genomic arrangement | Genomic segmentation |
|---|---|---|---|---|---|
| Tupavirus | Bullet-shaped | | Enveloped | Linear | |

== Life cycle ==
Viral replication is cytoplasmic. Entry into the host cell is achieved by attachment of the viral G glycoproteins to host receptors, which mediates clathrin-mediated endocytosis. Replication follows the negative stranded RNA virus replication model. Negative stranded RNA virus transcription, using polymerase stuttering is the method of transcription. The virus exits the host cell by budding, and tubule-guided viral movement. Birds serve as the natural host for Durham tupavirus, with antibodies having been found in the American coot (Fulica americana). Additionally, antibodies for Klamath tupavirus have been found in several species of deer, bison, and humans, as well as voles and shrews.

| Genus | Host details | Tissue tropism | Entry details | Release details | Replication site | Assembly site | Transmission |
|---|---|---|---|---|---|---|---|
| Tupavirus | Birds | None | Clathrin-mediated endocytosis | Budding | Cytoplasm | Cytoplasm | Unknown |
