= Sigma Virus =

Sigma Virus may refer to:

- Sigmaviruses, a clade of viruses in the family Rhabdoviridae that infect dipterans.
- The Sigma Virus from the Mega Man X video game series, and a major plot point in Marvel vs. Capcom Infinite
