= Ephemerovirus =

Virus classification
- (unranked): Virus
- Realm: Riboviria
- Kingdom: Orthornavirae
- Phylum: Negarnaviricota
- Class: Monjiviricetes
- Order: Mononegavirales
- Family: Rhabdoviridae
- Subfamily: Alpharhabdovirinae
- Genus: Ephemerovirus

Species
- See text

Genus of viruses

Ephemerovirus is a genus of viruses in the family Rhabdoviridae, order Mononegavirales. Cattle and mosquitoes serve as natural hosts. Diseases associated with viruses in this genus include: sudden fever.

== Structure ==
Ephemeroviruses are enveloped and have a bullet-shaped geometry. The virions are about 75 nm wide and 180 nm long.

== Genome ==
Ephemerovirus genomes are linear, monopartite, and around 14.6–14.8 kb in length. The genome codes for five to nine proteins.

== Life cycle ==
Viral replication is cytoplasmic. Entry into the host cell is achieved by attachment of the viral G glycoproteins to host receptors, which mediates clathrin-mediated endocytosis. Replication follows the negative stranded RNA virus replication model. Negative stranded RNA virus transcription, using polymerase stuttering is the method of transcription. The virus exits the host cell by budding, and tubule-guided viral movement. Cattle and mosquitos serve as the natural host. The virus is transmitted by mosquito bites.

== Taxonomy ==
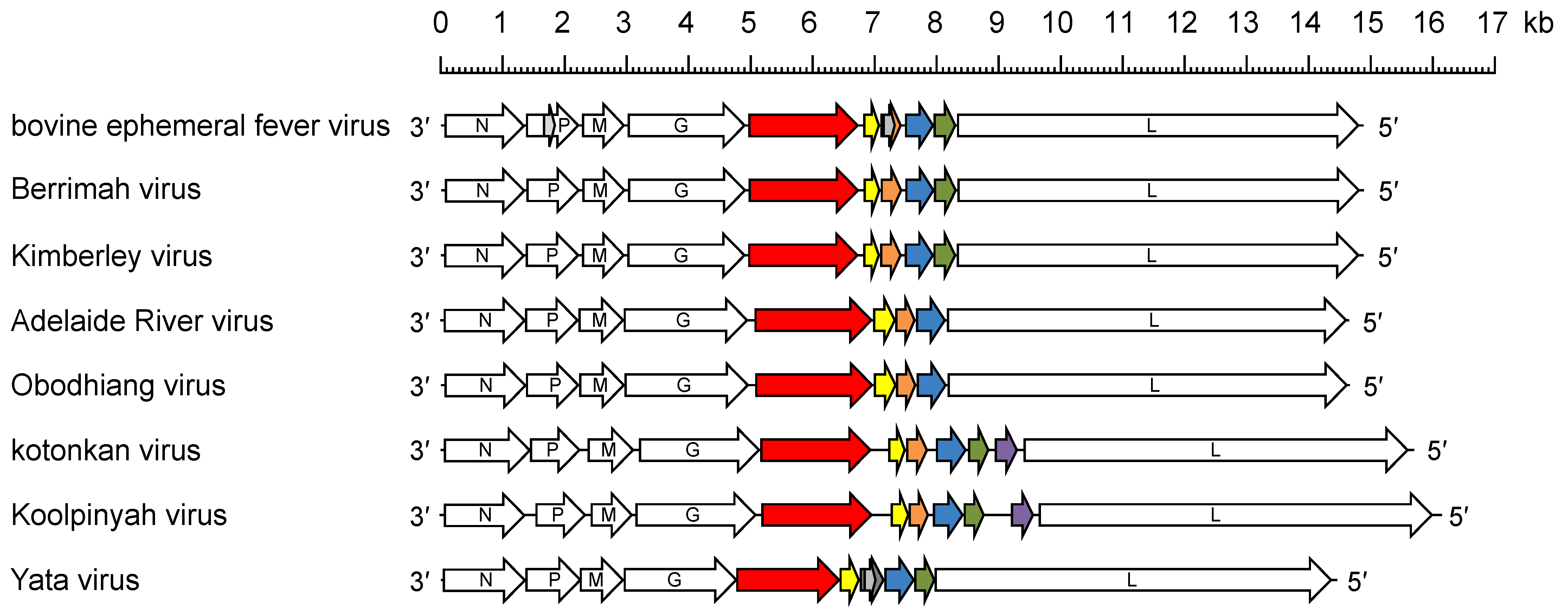
Ephemerovirus genomes

The genus contains the following species, listed by scientific name and followed by the exemplar virus of the species:

- Ephemerovirus adelaide, Adelaide River virus
- Ephemerovirus berrimah, Berrimah virus
- Ephemerovirus febris, Bovine ephemeral fever virus
- Ephemerovirus guangdong, Porcine ephemerovirus 2
- Ephemerovirus hardee, Hardee County ephemerovirus 1
- Ephemerovirus hayes, Hayes virus
- Ephemerovirus hefer, Hefer Valley virus
- Ephemerovirus henan, Porcine ephemerovirus 1
- Ephemerovirus kent, New Kent County virus
- Ephemerovirus kimberley, Kimberley virus
- Ephemerovirus koolpinyah, Koolpinyah virus
- Ephemerovirus kotonkan, Kotonkan virus
- Ephemerovirus obodhiang, Obodhiang virus
- Ephemerovirus puchong, Puchong virus
- Ephemerovirus yata, Yata virus
