= Artemvirus =

Virus classification
- (unranked): Virus
- Realm: Riboviria
- Kingdom: Orthornavirae
- Phylum: Negarnaviricota
- Class: Monjiviricetes
- Order: Mononegavirales
- Family: Lispiviridae
- Genus: Artemvirus

Genus of viruses

Artemvirus is a genus of viruses in the family Lispiviridae.

== Species ==
The genus contains the following species:

- Artemvirus bsaeighalis
- Artemvirus bsafalis
- Artemvirus bsafialis
- Artemvirus bsafivalis
- Artemvirus bsasecalis
- Artemvirus bsasialis
- Artemvirus bsathalis
