= Coroavirus =

Virus classification
- (unranked): Virus
- Realm: Riboviria
- Kingdom: Orthornavirae
- Phylum: Negarnaviricota
- Class: Monjiviricetes
- Order: Mononegavirales
- Family: Lispiviridae
- Genus: Coroavirus

Genus of viruses

Coroavirus is a genus of viruses in the family Lispiviridae.

== Species ==
The genus contains the following species:

- Coroavirus crysecense
- Coroavirus germense
