= Perhabdovirus =

Virus classification
- (unranked): Virus
- Realm: Riboviria
- Kingdom: Orthornavirae
- Phylum: Negarnaviricota
- Class: Monjiviricetes
- Order: Mononegavirales
- Family: Rhabdoviridae
- Genus: Perhabdovirus

Species
- See text

Genus of viruses

Perhabdovirus is a genus of viruses in the family Rhabdoviridae, order Mononegavirales. Fish serve as natural hosts. Diseases associated with viruses of this genus include: breathing and swimming problems.

== Taxonomy ==
The genus contains the following species, listed by scientific name and followed by the exemplar virus of the species:

- Perhabdovirus anguilla, Eel virus European X
- Perhabdovirus leman, Leman virus
- Perhabdovirus perca, Perch rhabdovirus
- Perhabdovirus trutta, Lake trout rhabdovirus

== Structure ==
Perhabdovirions are enveloped, with bullet shaped geometries. Perhabdovirus genomes are linear, around 11.1 kb in length. The genome codes for 5 proteins.

Genus	Structure	Symmetry	Capsid	Genomic arrangement	Genomic segmentation
Perhabdovirus	Bullet-shaped		Enveloped	Linear	

== Life cycle ==
Viral replication is cytoplasmic. Entry into the host cell is achieved by attachment of the viral G glycoproteins to host receptors, which mediates clathrin-mediated endocytosis. Replication follows the negative stranded RNA virus replication model. Negative stranded RNA virus transcription, using polymerase stuttering is the method of transcription. The virus exits the host cell by budding, and tubule-guided viral movement. Fish serve as the natural host.

Genus	Host details	Tissue tropism	Entry details	Release details	Replication site	Assembly site	Transmission
Perhabdovirus	Fish	None	Clathrin-mediated endocytosis	Budding	Cytoplasm	Cytoplasm	Waterborne
