= Sprivivirus =

Virus classification
- (unranked): Virus
- Realm: Riboviria
- Kingdom: Orthornavirae
- Phylum: Negarnaviricota
- Class: Monjiviricetes
- Order: Mononegavirales
- Family: Rhabdoviridae
- Subfamily: Alpharhabdovirinae
- Genus: Sprivivirus

Species
- See text

Genus of viruses

Sprivivirus is a genus of viruses in the family Rhabdoviridae, order Mononegavirales. Fish serve as natural hosts.

== Taxonomy ==
The genus contains the following species, listed by scientific name and followed by the exemplar virus of the species:

- Sprivivirus cyprinus, Spring viremia of carp virus
- Sprivivirus esox, Pike fry rhabdovirus

== Structure ==
Sprivivirions are enveloped, with bullet shaped geometries. Sprivivirus genomes are linear, around 11.1 kb in length. The genome codes for five proteins.

Genus	Structure	Symmetry	Capsid	Genomic arrangement	Genomic segmentation
Sprivivirus	Bullet-shaped		Enveloped	Linear	

== Life cycle ==
Viral replication is cytoplasmic. Entry into the host cell is achieved by attachment of the viral G glycoproteins to host receptors, which mediates clathrin-mediated endocytosis. Replication follows the negative stranded RNA virus replication model. Negative stranded RNA virus transcription, using polymerase stuttering is the method of transcription. The virus exits the host cell by budding, and tubule-guided viral movement. Fish serve as the natural host.

Genus	Host details	Tissue tropism	Entry details	Release details	Replication site	Assembly site	Transmission
Sprivivirus	Fish	None	Clathrin-mediated endocytosis	Budding	Cytoplasm	Cytoplasm	Tubule-guided viral movement
