= Bas-Congo virus =

Virus classification
- (unranked): Virus
- Realm: Riboviria
- Kingdom: Orthornavirae
- Phylum: Negarnaviricota
- Class: Monjiviricetes
- Order: Mononegavirales
- Family: Rhabdoviridae
- Genus: Tibrovirus
- Species: Tibrovirus congo

Synonyms
- Bas-Congo tibrovirus

Species of virus

Bas-Congo virus (BASV) is a poorly characterized rhabdovirus discovered in the blood of a patient who survived a severe illness resembling hemorrhagic fever. The virus was named after the former Democratic Republic of Congo province of Bas-Congo (now Kongo Central). BASV was discovered using next-generation sequencing and attempts to isolate the virus were not successful. BASV RNA has only been detected in one individual and its role as a human pathogen has not been established.

== Discovery ==
In the spring of 2009, two teenagers living in Mangala, a small village located in the westernmost province of the Democratic Republic of Congo, developed a severe illness with symptoms that included: fever, headache, abdominal pain, mouth and nasal bleeding, hematemesis, and bloody diarrhea. Both of the teenagers died within days of developing symptoms.

More than a week later, a 32-year-old nurse who cared for the two teenagers, fell ill. His symptoms were similar to the two teenagers: nasal, ocular, and oral bleeding; hematemesis and bloody diarrhea. He was provided supportive care and recovered. A blood sample was collected and subjected to next-generation sequencing. Analysis revealed the presence of a novel rhabdovirus, BASV, that was similar to other members of the poorly characterized Tibrovirus genus.

== Disease association ==
BASV was present in the blood of the infected individual at more than 1 million RNA copies/mL of plasma, suggesting an active infection.

Although next-generation sequencing is a powerful tool for detecting novel viruses, it does not unambiguously establish BASV as the cause of the patient's illness. Indeed, other experts have suggested that BASV is not the cause of the patient's illness and noted that an outbreak of Shigella was occurring in the area at the same time.

== Genome ==
The complete BASV genome is not available. An 11,892 bp genome has been reported, which is likely 95% - 98% complete. The BASV genome consists of the five typical rhabdovirus genes (N, P, M, G and L), as well as three open reading frames of unknown function (U1, U2, and U3).

== Incidence and prevalence ==
Little is known about the incidence or prevalence of BASV. BASV antibodies were detected in the infected patient, as well as a close contact who did not show any symptoms of disease. A serosurvey of 50 randomly selected blood donors in the Kasai-Oriental Province in the Democratic Republic of Congo did not detect any positive samples.

== Transmission ==
The natural reservoir and route of transmission of BASV are unknown. A machine learning algorithm designed to predict animal reservoirs and arthropod vectors suggests the natural host may be cattle and the insect vector a biting midge.

== Relationship to other rhabdoviruses ==
Phylogenetic analysis of the polymerase protein (L) revealed indicates that BASV is most closely related to members of the tibrovirus genus. There are nine known tibroviruses, including BASV. Four tibroviruses have been isolated from biting midges (Culicoides), three from humans, and one from a healthy steer. With the exception of Bas-Congo, none of the other tibroviruses have been associated with any disease. Experimental infection of cattle with various tibroviruses does not produce any symptoms of disease.
