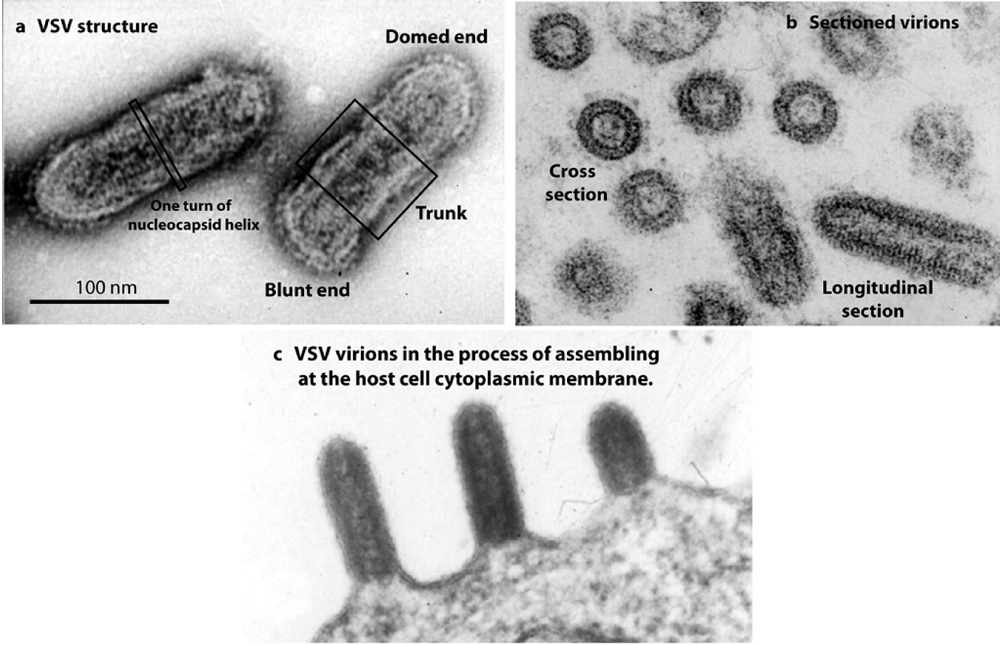
- Electron micrograph of Vesicular stomatitis virus structure and assembly

Virus classification
- (unranked): Virus
- Realm: Riboviria
- Kingdom: Orthornavirae
- Phylum: Negarnaviricota
- Class: Monjiviricetes
- Order: Mononegavirales
- Family: Rhabdoviridae
- Subfamily: Alpharhabdovirinae
- Genus: Vesiculovirus

= Vesiculovirus =

Genus of viruses

Vesiculovirus is a genus of negative-sense single-stranded RNA viruses in the family Rhabdoviridae, within the order Mononegavirales.

== Taxonomy ==
The genus contains the following species, listed by scientific name and followed by the exemplar virus of the species:

- Vesiculovirus alagoas, Vesicular stomatitis Alagoas virus
- Vesiculovirus bogdanovac, Yug Bogdanovac virus
- Vesiculovirus carajas, Carajas virus
- Vesiculovirus chandipura, Chandipura virus
- Vesiculovirus cocal, Cocal virus
- Vesiculovirus eptesicus, American bat vesiculovirus
- Vesiculovirus indiana, Vesicular stomatitis Indiana virus
- Vesiculovirus isfahan, Isfahan virus
- Vesiculovirus jurona, Jurona virus
- Vesiculovirus malpais, Malpais Spring virus
- Vesiculovirus maraba, Maraba virus
- Vesiculovirus mediterranean, Mediterranean bat virus
- Vesiculovirus mejal, Mejal virus
- Vesiculovirus morreton, Morreton virus
- Vesiculovirus newjersey, Vesicular stomatitis New Jersey virus
- Vesiculovirus perinet, Perinet virus
- Vesiculovirus piry, Piry virus
- Vesiculovirus radi, Radi virus
- Vesiculovirus rhinolophus, Jinghong bat virus
- Vesiculovirus wufeng, Wufeng Myotis altarium vesiculovirus 1
- Vesiculovirus yinshui, Yinshui bat virus
