= Betarhabdovirinae =

Virus classification
- (unranked): Virus
- Realm: Riboviria
- Kingdom: Orthornavirae
- Phylum: Negarnaviricota
- Class: Monjiviricetes
- Order: Mononegavirales
- Family: Rhabdoviridae
- Subfamily: Betarhabdovirinae

Subfamily of viruses

Betarhabdovirinae is a subfamily of viruses in the family Rhabdoviridae.

== Taxonomy ==
The subfamily contains the following genera:

- Alphacytorhabdovirus
- Alphagymnorhavirus
- Alphanucleorhabdovirus
- Betacytorhabdovirus
- Betagymnorhavirus
- Betanucleorhabdovirus
- Deltanucleorhabdovirus
- Dichorhavirus
- Gammacytorhabdovirus
- Gammanucleorhabdovirus
- Trirhavirus
- Varicosavirus

== See also ==
- Nucleorhabdovirus
