= Lettuce big-vein disease =

Viral disease of lettuce plants

- Causal agents: lettuce big-vein associated virus (LBVaV)
- Hosts: Lettuce
- Vectors: Olpidium brassicae
- Treatment: See text

Lettuce big-vein disease causes leaf distortion and ruffling in affected lettuce plants.

This disease was first associated in 1983 with a rod-shaped virus named lettuce big-vein associated virus (LBVaV), which is transmitted by the obligately parasitic soil-inhabiting fungus, Olpidium brassicae. However, in 2000, a second virus, Mirafiori lettuce big-vein virus (MLBVV), was found in lettuce showing big-vein symptoms. Furthermore, since the lettuce infected with LBVaV alone doesn't develop the symptoms while the infected with MLBVV one does, the latter virus is considered to be a main agent of the big-vein disease.

== Symptoms ==
Affected plants have veins that become large and clear, causing the rest of the leaf to become ruffled. Severely infected plants may fail to form a lettuce head.

== Control ==
- Grow disease-resistant cultivars.
- Use disease-free healthy seeds.
- Treat with methyl bromide, chloropicrin, or dazomet solution.
