= Sigmavirus =

Virus classification
- (unranked): Virus
- Realm: Riboviria
- Kingdom: Orthornavirae
- Phylum: Negarnaviricota
- Class: Monjiviricetes
- Order: Mononegavirales
- Family: Rhabdoviridae
- Subfamily: Alpharhabdovirinae
- Genus: Sigmavirus

Genus of viruses

Sigmavirus is a genus of viruses in the family Rhabdoviridae, order Mononegavirales. Sigmaviruses naturally infect dipterans.

== Taxonomy ==
The genus contains the following species, listed by scientific name and followed by the exemplar virus of the species:

- Sigmavirus affinis, Drosophila affinis sigmavirus
- Sigmavirus ananassae, Drosophila ananassae sigmavirus
- Sigmavirus bangalore, Zeugodacus cucurbitae sigmavirus 2
- Sigmavirus capitata, Ceratitis capitata sigmavirus
- Sigmavirus cucurbitae, Zeugodacus cucurbitae sigmavirus 1
- Sigmavirus domestica, Wuhan fly virus 2
- Sigmavirus dorsalis, Bactrocera dorsalis sigmavirus
- Sigmavirus hangzhou, Hangzhou rhabdovirus 4
- Sigmavirus hippoboscid, Wuhan louse fly virus 9
- Sigmavirus hubei, Hubei diptera virus 9
- Sigmavirus immigrans, Drosophila immigrans sigmavirus
- Sigmavirus jopcycgri, Jopcycgri virus 1
- Sigmavirus lousefly, Wuhan louse fly virus 10
- Sigmavirus melanogaster, Drosophila melanogaster sigmavirus
- Sigmavirus muscina, Muscina stabulans sigmavirus
- Sigmavirus myga, Hubei diptera virus 10
- Sigmavirus obscura, Drosophila obscura sigmavirus
- Sigmavirus shayang, Shayang fly virus 2
- Sigmavirus sichuan, Apis rhabdovirus 3
- Sigmavirus sturtevanti, Drosophila sturtevanti sigmavirus
- Sigmavirus tristis, Drosophila tristis sigmavirus
- Sigmavirus tryoni, Bactrocera tyroni rhabdovirus 1
- Sigmavirus tuva, Aksy-Durug Melophagus sigmavirus
- Sigmavirus wuhan, Wuhan house fly virus 1
- Sigmavirus ying, Hubei dimarhabdovirus 1
- Sigmavirus yushu, Yushu rhabdovirus

== Discovery ==
Drosophila melanogaster sigmavirus (DMelSV) was discovered by a group of French researchers in 1937 after they observed certain fly lines became paralysed and died on exposure to carbon dioxide (which is commonly used as an anesthetic for Drosophila). They found the carbon dioxide sensitivity was caused by an infectious agent which they named sigma, and was later found to be a rhabdovirus. More recently new sigmaviruses have been discovered in diptera of six species; five in species of Drosophila and one in the family Muscidae.

== Transmission ==
DMelSV, DAffSV and DObsSV are transmitted vertically by both drosophila parents (i.e. through both eggs and sperm) suggesting sigmaviruses may be a clade of vertically transmitted viruses. This unusual mode of biparental vertical transmission allows the virus to spread through host populations even if it reduces the fitness of infected hosts.

== Host resistance ==
In Drosophila melanogaster resistance alleles in the genes ref(2)p and CHKov 1 and 2 and have been identified that explain a large amount of the genetic variation in susceptibility to DMelSV infection.

== Structure ==
Sigmavirions are enveloped, with bullet shaped geometries. Sigmavirus genomes are linear, around 12.6 kb in length. The genome codes for 6 proteins (3' to 5': N-P-X-M-G-L).

| Genus | Structure | Symmetry | Capsid | Genomic arrangement | Genomic segmentation |
|---|---|---|---|---|---|
| Sigmavirus | Bullet-shaped | | Enveloped | Linear | |

== Life cycle ==
Viral replication is cytoplasmic. Entry into the host cell is achieved by attachment of the viral G glycoproteins to host receptors, which mediates clathrin-mediated endocytosis. Replication follows the negative stranded RNA virus replication model. Negative stranded RNA virus transcription, using polymerase stuttering is the method of transcription. The virus exits the host cell by budding, and tubule-guided viral movement. Drosophilae serve as the natural host.

| Genus | Host details | Tissue tropism | Entry details | Release details | Replication site | Assembly site | Transmission |
|---|---|---|---|---|---|---|---|
| Sigmavirus | Drosophila | None | Clathrin-mediated endocytosis | Budding | Cytoplasm | Cytoplasm | Unknown |
