= Hart Park =

Hart Park may refer to:

- Hart Memorial Park, a park in Kern County, California, United States
- Hart Park (Wauwatosa, Wisconsin), a park on the Menominee River in Wauwatosa, Wisconsin, United States
- Hart State Park, a community natural park in Hartwell, Georgia, United States
- Hart Park virus, an arbovirus
- William S. Hart Park, a county park in Santa Clarita, California, United States
