= VSV-G =

Envelope glycoprotein of vesicular stomatitis virus

VSV-G is the envelope glycoprotein of vesicular stomatitis virus (VSV), a rhabdovirus that infects livestock. It is the only envelope protein encoded by VSV and mediates VSV virions' attachment to host cells and the fusion of their membrane with the membrane of their host. VSV-G is widely used for viral psuedotyping, due to its broad host cell tropism.

== Function ==
VSV-G binds to the LDL-Receptor and other members of the LDL-Receptor Family, which serve as receptors for VSV.

== Uses in Research ==
Lentiviral and retroviral vectors pseudotyped with VSV-G are frequently used in cell biology research to introduce genes to broad range of mammalian cell types.
