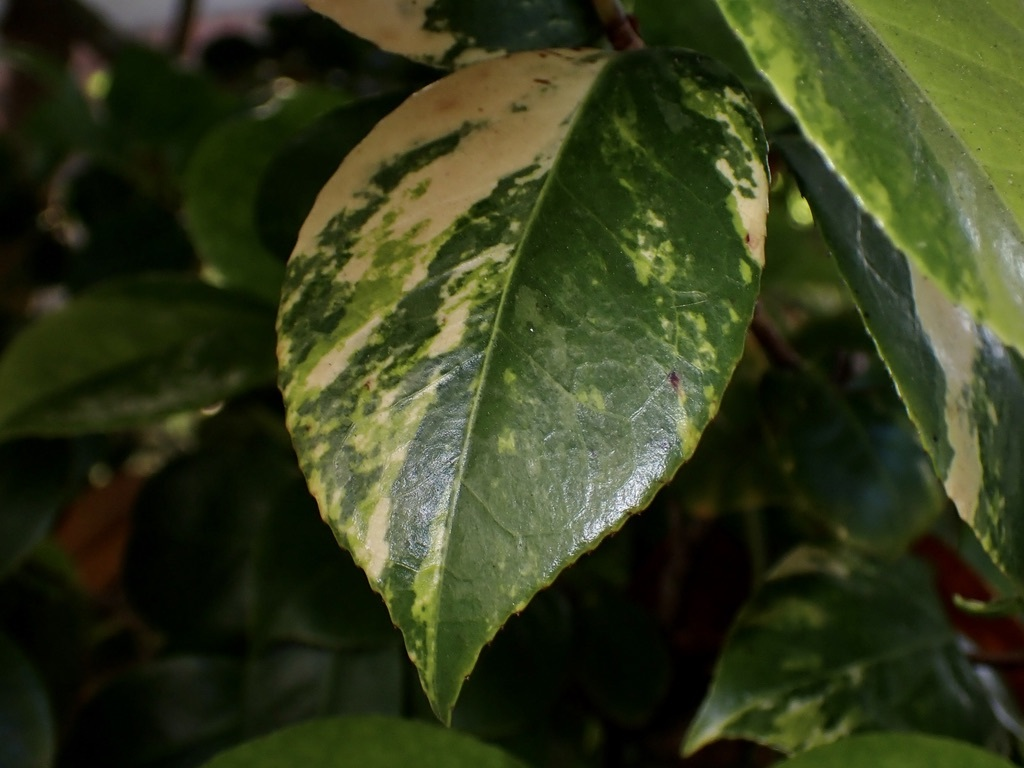

Virus classification
- (unranked): Virus
- Realm: Riboviria
- Kingdom: Orthornavirae
- Phylum: Negarnaviricota
- Class: Monjiviricetes
- Order: Mononegavirales
- Family: Rhabdoviridae
- Subfamily: Betarhabdovirinae
- Genus: Varicosavirus

= Varicosavirus =

Genus of viruses

Varicosavirus is a genus of plant viruses. The virus is associated with swelling in plant vein tissues. They are negative single stranded RNA viruses. The genus contains 46 species.

== Classification ==
The genus contains the following species, listed by scientific name and followed by the exemplar virus of the species:

- Varicosavirus aconiti, Aconitum virus 1
- Varicosavirus agastachi, Agastache rugosa associated varicosavirus
- Varicosavirus allii, Allium angulosum virus 1
- Varicosavirus alopecuri, Alopecurus myosuroides varicosavirus 1
- Varicosavirus alphabrassicae, Brassica rapa virus 1
- Varicosavirus aperae, Apera virus 1
- Varicosavirus aponogeti, Aponogeton virus 1
- Varicosavirus arceuthobii, Arceuthobium virus 8
- Varicosavirus artemisiae, Artemisia virus 1
- Varicosavirus asclepiadis, Asclepias syriaca virus 3
- Varicosavirus betabrassicae, Brassica virus 2
- Varicosavirus caladeniae, Caladenia virus 1
- Varicosavirus centaurea, Centaurea virus 1
- Varicosavirus cucumis, Cucumis virus 1
- Varicosavirus didymochlaenae, Didymochlaena virus 1
- Varicosavirus erysimi, Erysimum virus 1
- Varicosavirus frullaniae, Frullania virus 1
- Varicosavirus guizotiae, Guizotia virus 1
- Varicosavirus holci, Holcus virus 1
- Varicosavirus ipomoeae, Morning glory varicosavirus
- Varicosavirus lactucae, Lettuce big vein-associated virus
- Varicosavirus leucanthemi, Leucanthemum virus 1
- Varicosavirus lolii, Lolium perenne virus 1
- Varicosavirus luffae, Luffa virus 1
- Varicosavirus melampyri, Melampyrum roseum virus 1
- Varicosavirus meliloti, Melilotus virus 1
- Varicosavirus monocleae, Monoclea gottschei varicosa-like virus
- Varicosavirus orychophragmi, Orychophragmus violaceus varicosavirus
- Varicosavirus penniseti, Pennisetum virus 1
- Varicosavirus primulae, Primula virus 1
- Varicosavirus ranunculi, Ranunculus virus 1
- Varicosavirus raphani, Raphanus virus 1
- Varicosavirus ribes, Ribes virus 1
- Varicosavirus rubi, Rubus varicosavirus 1
- Varicosavirus silenis, Silene virus 1
- Varicosavirus streptoglossae, Streptoglossa virus 1
- Varicosavirus tanaceti, Tanacetum virus 1
- Varicosavirus thrysopteris, Tree fern varicosa-like virus
- Varicosavirus treubiae, Treubia virus 1
- Varicosavirus trifolii, Red clover-associated varicosavirus
- Varicosavirus tritici, Triticum virus 1
- Varicosavirus vincetoxici, Vincetoxicum virus 1
- Varicosavirus vitis, Vitis varicosavirus
- Varicosavirus xinjiangense, Xinjiang varicosavirus
- Varicosavirus zea, Zea virus 1
- Varicosavirus zosterae, Zostera-associated varicosavirus 1

== Structure ==
Virions consist of a non-enveloped rod-shaped capsid, having a helical symmetry of 120–360 nm in length, and a width of 18–30 nm.

== Genome ==
The genome consists of a bi-segmented linear, single-stranded negative sense RNA. The first segment is about 6350–7000 nucleotides in length; the second, about 5630–6500 nucleotides in length.
