= Cytorhabdovirus =

Obsolete genus of viruses

Cytorhabdovirus was a genus of viruses in the family Rhabdoviridae, subfamily Betarhabdovirinae. In 2025, the genus was split into the following three genera, all of which still contain the name cytorhabdovirus and which are assigned to the same family and subfamily:

- Alphacytorhabdovirus
- Betacytorhabdovirus
- Gammacytorhabdovirus
