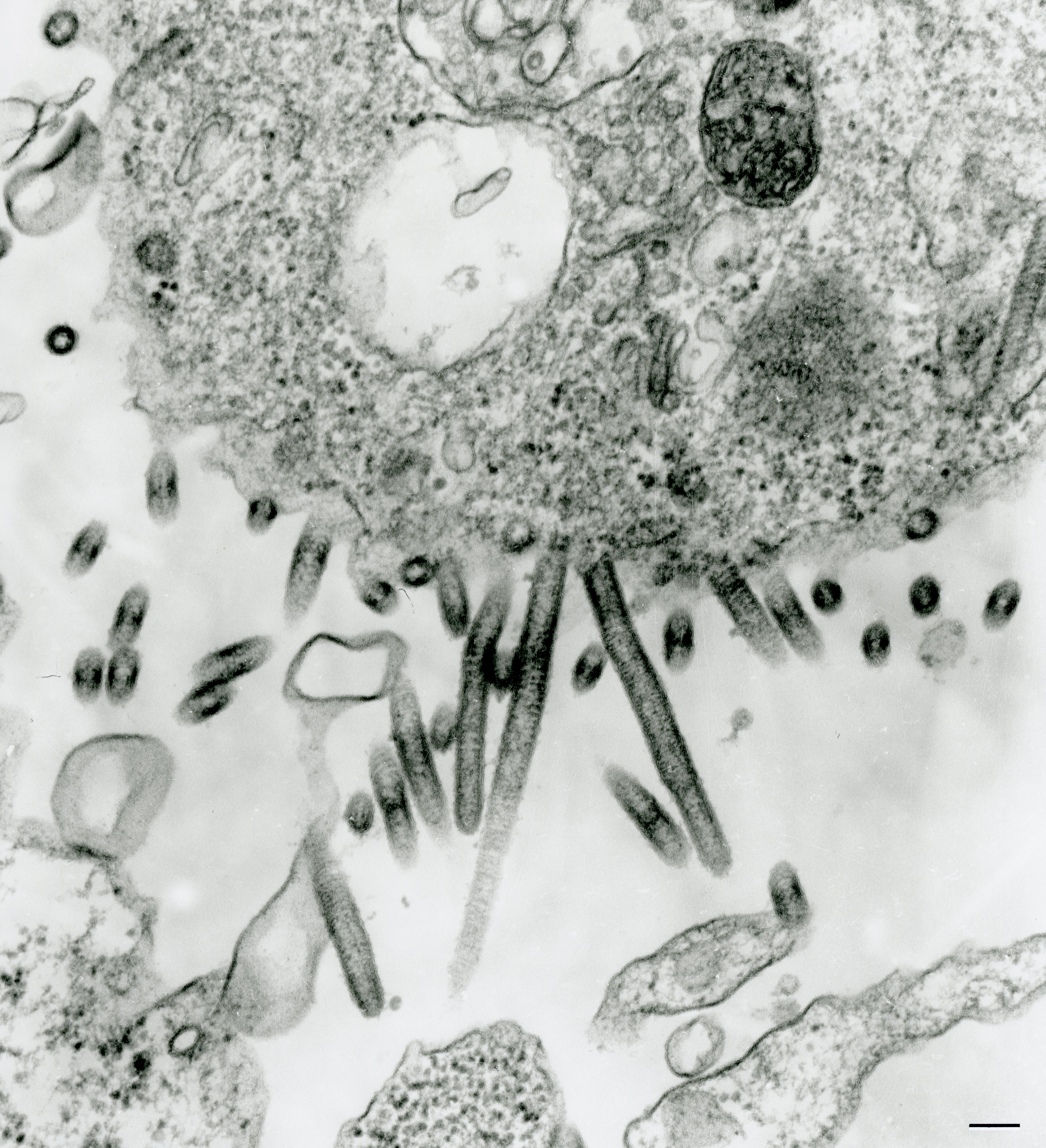
- Sweetwater Branch virus (530 nm to 690 nm and up to 900 nm long, 65 nm to 75 nm in diameter)

Virus classification
- (unranked): Virus
- Realm: Riboviria
- Kingdom: Orthornavirae
- Phylum: Negarnaviricota
- Class: Monjiviricetes
- Order: Mononegavirales
- Family: Rhabdoviridae
- Subfamily: Alpharhabdovirinae
- Genus: Tibrovirus

Species
- See text

= Tibrovirus =

Genus of viruses

Tibrovirus is a genus of viruses in the family Rhabdoviridae, order Mononegavirales. There are 9 members of the genus. Tibroviruses have been isolated from biting midges, cattle, and humans. None of the tibroviruses, except for Bas-Congo virus, have been associated with any diseases.

== Genus members ==
- Bas-Congo virus (BASV, Tibrovirus congo) was discovered in 2009 in the Democratic Republic of Congo in a blood sample collected from a 32-year-old male who survived a severe illness resembling hemorrhagic fever. BASV could not be isolated from the patient’s sample has not been established as a human pathogen.
- Beatrice Hill virus (BHV, Tibrovirus beatrice) was isolated from a pool of biting midges (Culicoides peregrinus) in 1984 in Northern Territory, Australia. BHV is poorly characterized and serological studies to assess its prevalence have not been carried out.
- Bivens arm virus (BAV) was isolated in 1981-1982 from a pool of biting midges in Florida. Anti-BAV antibodies have been detected in a variety of animals, including cattle, throughout Florida and the Caribbean. There is no evidence of human infection or any disease associated with BAV.
- Coastal Plains virus (CPV, Tibrovirus coastal) was discovered in 1981 in Northern Territory, Australia in the blood of a healthy, asymptomatic steer. No anti-CPV antibodies have ever been detected in humans and no disease has been associated with CPV.
- Ekpoma virus 1 (EKV-1, Tibrovirus alphaekpoma) was discovered in 2015 in a blood sample collected from a healthy, 45-year-old woman living in Ekpoma, Nigeria. EKV-1 was present in her blood at 4.5 million RNA copies/mL suggesting robust replication. Experiments using a recombinant vesicular stomatitis virus expressing the EKV-1 envelope glycoprotein indicate EKV-1 has very broad tropism and can efficiently enter nearly all types of human cells. EKV-1 could not be isolated from the patient’s blood sample and live replication-competent virus is not available.
- Ekpoma virus 2 (EKV-2, Tibrovirus betaekpoma) was discovered in 2015 in a blood sample collected from a healthy, 19-year-old woman living in Ekpoma, Nigeria. EKV-2 was present in her blood at 45,000 RNA copies/mL suggesting modest replication. Experiments using a recombinant vesicular stomatitis virus expressing the EKV-2 envelope glycoprotein indicate EKV-2 has very broad tropism similar to EKV-1. EKV-2 also could not be isolated from the patient’s blood sample and live replication-competent virus is not available.
- Mundri virus (MUNV, Tibrovirus mundri)
- Sweetwater branch virus (SWBV, Tibrovirus sweetwater) was isolated along with BAV from pools of biting midges in Florida in 1981-1982. Like BAV, SWBV exposure in various animals is likely widespread. There is no evidence of human exposure or any disease associated with the virus.
- Tibrogargan virus (TIBV, Tibrovirus tibrogargan), the first tibrovirus discovered, was isolated from a pool of biting midges (Culicoides brevitarsis) in 1976 in Peachester, Australia. TIBV appears to be widespread among cattle in Australia. A survey of more than 3,000 cattle found many herds were 100% seropositive. TIBV infection of humans has not been reported. TIBV is an orphan virus and not associated with any disease. Experimental infections of cattle produced viremia, but no observable signs of illness.

== Transmission ==
BHV, BAV, SWBV and TIBV were isolated from biting midges, suggesting that midges are the major arthropod vector for these viruses. It is not known how BASV, EKV-1 and EKV-2 are transmitted.

== Genetic divergence ==
Tibroviruses are highly divergent. For example, overall amino acid homology among the human-associated tibroviruses (i.e. BASV, EKV-1 and EKV-2) ranges from 33% - 39%.

== Morphology ==
Tibrovirus virions are enveloped, but only the morphology of Tibrogargan virus and Sweetwater branch virus have been observed by electron microscopy.

Genus	Structure	Symmetry	Capsid	Genomic arrangement	Genomic segmentation
Tibrovirus	Bullet-shaped	Helical	Enveloped	Linear	Non-segmented

== Genome ==
Tibrovirus genomes are single-stranded, negative-sense RNA molecules approximately 13 kb in length. The genome encodes for the typical five proteins found in all rhabdoviruses: nucleocapsid (N), phosphoprotein (P), matrix (M), glycoprotein (G), and polymerase (L). However, there are three additional genes, U1-U3, that encode for proteins of unknown function.

== Life cycle ==
Viral replication is cytoplasmic. Entry into the host cell is achieved by attachment of the viral G glycoproteins to host receptors, which mediate clathrin-mediated endocytosis. Replication follows the negative-stranded RNA virus replication model. Negative stranded RNA virus transcription, using polymerase stuttering is the method of transcription. The virus exits the host cell by budding, and tubule-guided viral movement.

Genus	Host details	Tissue tropism	Entry details	Release details	Replication site	Assembly site	Transmission
Tibrovirus	Bovine	None	Clathrin-mediated endocytosis	Budding	Cytoplasm	Cytoplasm	Zoonosis; arthropod bite: midges
