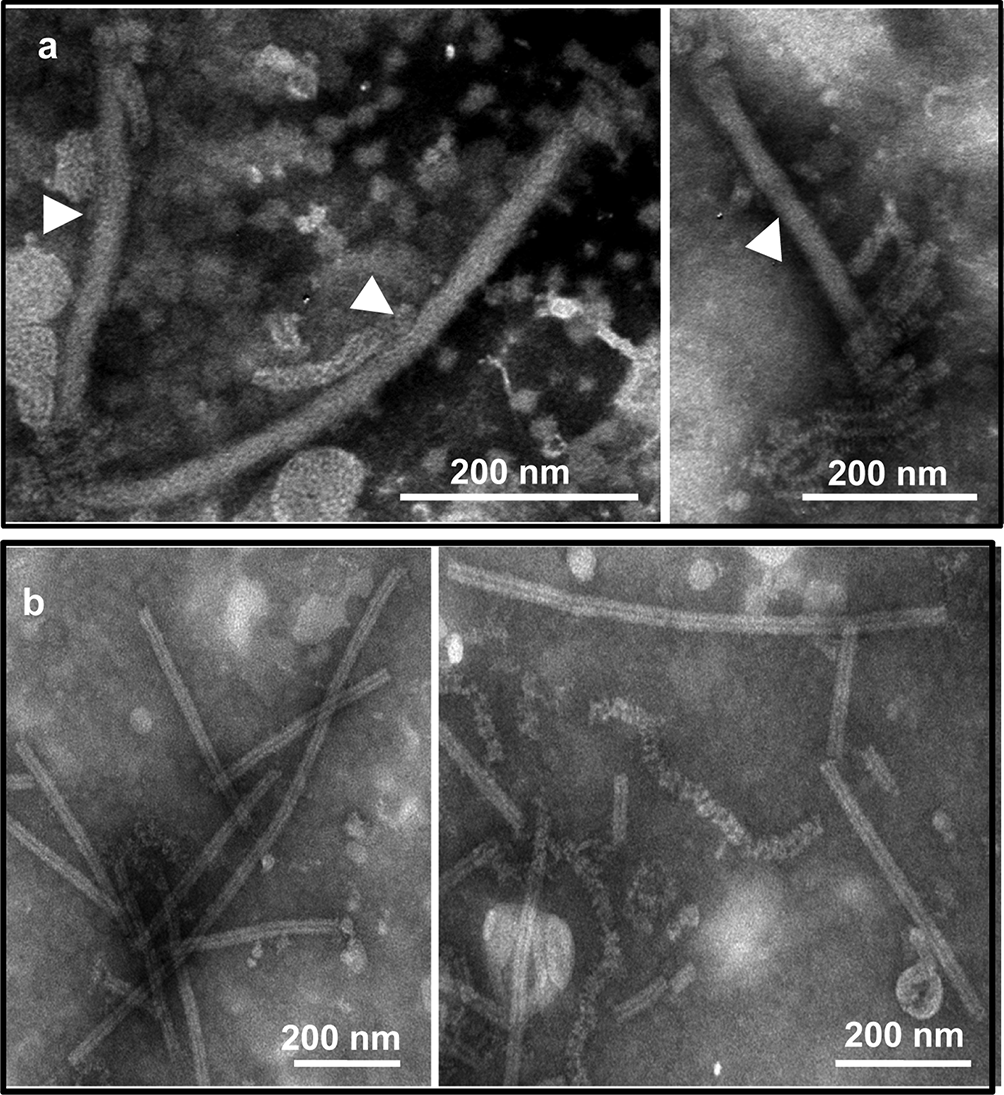

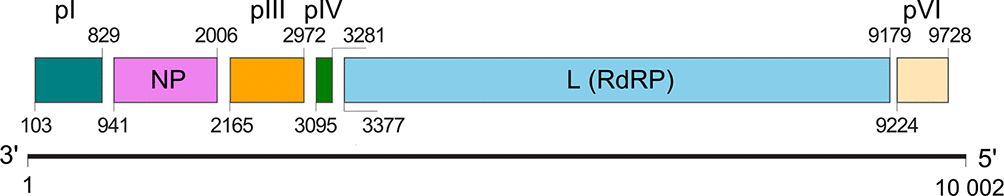
- Structure of virions, nucleoprotein–RNA complexes, and genome of SsNSRV-1

Virus classification
- (unranked): Virus
- Realm: Riboviria
- Kingdom: Orthornavirae
- Phylum: Negarnaviricota
- Class: Monjiviricetes
- Order: Mononegavirales
- Family: Mymonaviridae

= Mymonaviridae =

Family of viruses

Mymonaviridae is a family of negative-strand RNA viruses in the order Mononegavirales, which infect fungi. Fungi serve as natural hosts. The name is a portmanteau of Ancient Greek myco, which means fungus, and mononegavirales. This family was established to accommodate Sclerotinia sclerotiorum negative-stranded RNA virus 1 (SsNSRV-1) a novel virus discovered in a hypovirulent strain of Sclerotinia sclerotiorum.

== Taxonomy ==
The following genera are recognized:

- Auricularimonavirus
- Botrytimonavirus
- Hubramonavirus
- Lentimonavirus
- Penicillimonavirus
- Phyllomonavirus
- Plasmopamonavirus
- Rhizomonavirus
- Sclerotimonavirus
