= Artoviridae =

- Electron micrographs of PpNSRV-1 purified particles

Virus classification
- (unranked): Virus
- Realm: Riboviria
- Kingdom: Orthornavirae
- Phylum: Negarnaviricota
- Class: Monjiviricetes
- Order: Mononegavirales
- Family: Artoviridae

Family of viruses

Artoviridae is a family of negative-strand RNA viruses in the order Mononegavirales. Barnacles, copepods, odonates, parasitoid wasps, pile worms, and woodlice serve as natural hosts. The group name derives from arthropod the phylum of its hosts. Members of the family were initially discovered by high throughput sequencing.

== Structure ==
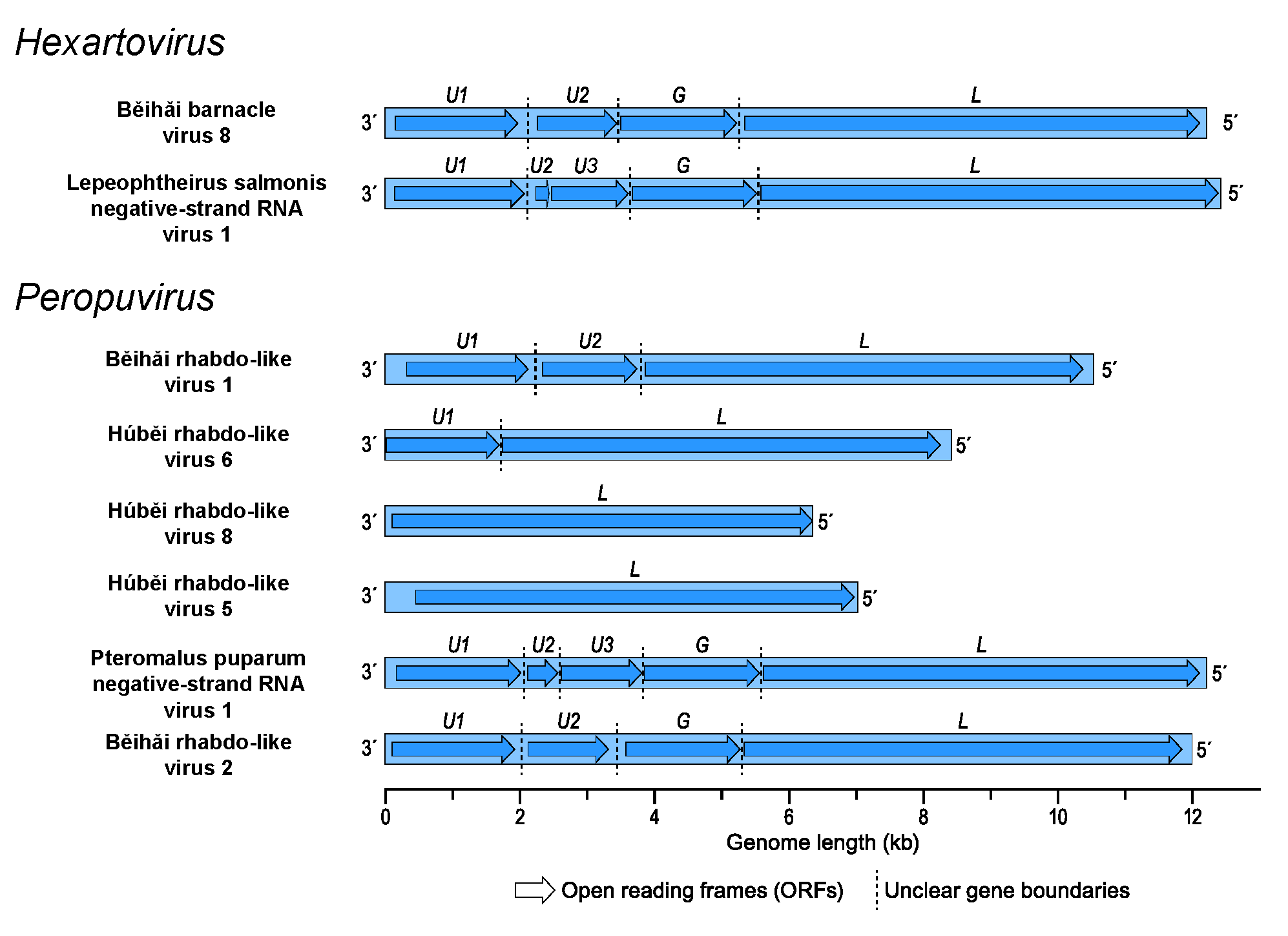
Artovirus genome organization

Virions are enveloped, spherical particles, 100 to 130 nm in diameter, and the virus genome comprises about 12 kb of negative-sense, unsegmented RNA.

== Taxonomy ==
The family contains the following genera:

- Hexartovirus
- Peropuvirus
