= Nucleorhabdovirus =

Obsolete genus of viruses

Nucleorhabdovirus was a genus of viruses in the family Rhabdoviridae. In 2020, the genus was split into the following three genera, all of which still contain the name nucleorhabdovirus and which are assigned to the same family:

- Alphanucleorhabdovirus
- Betanucleorhabdovirus
- Gammanucleorhabdovirus

In 2021, the three genera were organized into subfamily Betarhabdovirinae. In 2024, the genus Deltanucleorhabdovirus was established and placed in the same subfamily as the other -nucleorhabdovirus genera.
