= Xinmoviridae =

Virus classification
- (unranked): Virus
- Realm: Riboviria
- Kingdom: Orthornavirae
- Phylum: Negarnaviricota
- Class: Monjiviricetes
- Order: Mononegavirales
- Family: Xinmoviridae

Genera
- See text

Family of viruses

Xinmoviridae is a family of negative-strand RNA viruses. The family includes 27 genera and 30 species. Xinmovirids typically infect insects in Africa, Asia, Europe, and Oceania.

== Taxonomy ==
The family contains the following genera:

- Alasvirus
- Anphevirus
- Corulvirus
- Culivirus
- Dorsavirus
- Doupovirus
- Draselvirus
- Drunivirus
- Gambievirus
- Gordisvirus
- Gudgevirus
- Gylbovirus
- Hoptevirus
- Hyatvirus
- Laumovirus
- Madalivirus
- Molauvirus
- Nurnegvirus
- Omyavirus
- Opavirus
- Pelmivirus
- Puclevirus
- Tecephavirus
- Triniovirus
- Trocevirus
- Ulegvirus
- Yahinvirus

Of these genera, all are monotypic except Madalivirus, Gambievirus, and Culivirus.
