= Copasivirus =

Virus classification
- Missing taxonomy template (fix): Copasivirus

Genus of viruses

Copasivirus is a genus of viruses in the family Lispiviridae.

== Species ==
The genus includes the following species:

- Copasivirus cattienense
- Copasivirus ivindoense
- Copasivirus macbelense
- Copasivirus macnatense
- Copasivirus macsubense
- Copasivirus manlyvaleense
