= Sunviridae =

Virus classification
- (unranked): Virus
- Realm: Riboviria
- Kingdom: Orthornavirae
- Phylum: Negarnaviricota
- Class: Monjiviricetes
- Order: Mononegavirales
- Family: Sunviridae

Family of viruses

Sunviridae is a family of negative-strand RNA viruses in the order Mononegavirales. Snakes serve as natural hosts. The family includes the single genus Sunshinevirus which includes the single species Sunshinevirus reptilis. The family was formed to accommodate the Sunshine Coast virus (SunCV), previously referred to as "Sunshine virus", a novel virus discovered in Australian pythons. The name derives from the geographic origin of the first isolate on the Sunshine Coast of Queensland, Australia.

== Genome ==
Genome of Sunshine Coast virus

Sunshineviruses have a nonsegmented, negative-sense, single-stranded RNA genome. The total length of the genome is 17 kbp. The genome encodes seven proteins.
