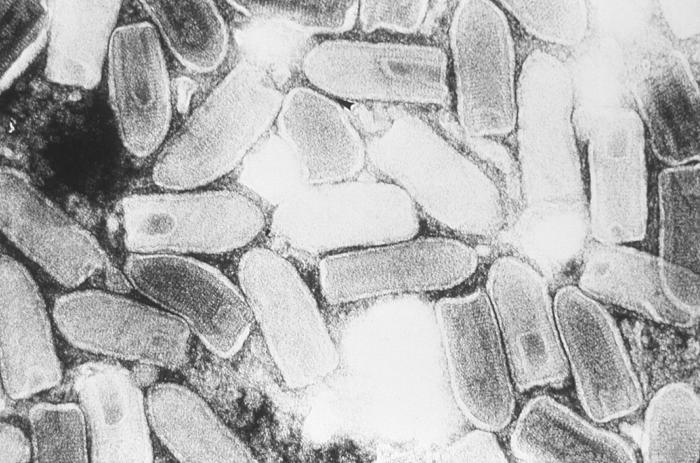
- TEM micrograph of Vesiculovirus indiana particles

Virus classification
- (unranked): Virus
- Realm: Riboviria
- Kingdom: Orthornavirae
- Phylum: Negarnaviricota
- Class: Monjiviricetes
- Order: Mononegavirales
- Family: Rhabdoviridae
- Genus: Vesiculovirus
- Species: Vesiculovirus indiana

Synonyms
- Vesicular stomatitis Indiana virus; Vesicular stomatitis virus; Indiana vesiculovirus

= Indiana vesiculovirus =

Vesiculovirus indiana

Species of virus

Vesiculovirus indiana, formerly Vesicular stomatitis Indiana virus (VSIV or VSV) is a virus in the family Rhabdoviridae; the well-known Rabies lyssavirus belongs to the same family. VSIV is often transmitted by insect vector, and can infect cattle, horses and pigs. It has particular importance to farmers in certain regions of the world where it infects cattle. This is because its clinical presentation is identical to the very important foot and mouth disease virus.

The virus is zoonotic and leads to a flu-like illness in infected humans.

It is also a common laboratory virus used to study the properties of viruses in the family Rhabdoviridae, as well as to study viral evolution.

== Properties ==
Vesiculovirus indiana is the prototypic member of the genus Vesiculovirus of the family Rhabdoviridae. VSIV is an arbovirus, and its replication occurs in the cytoplasm. Natural VSIV infections encompass two steps, cytolytic infections of mammalian hosts and transmission by insects. In insects, infections are noncytolytic persistent. One confirmed vector of the virus is the phlebotomine sand fly Lutzomyia shannoni. The genome of VSIV is on a single molecule of negative-sense RNA that has 11,161 nucleotides in length, that encodes five major proteins: G protein (G), large protein (L), phosphoprotein (P), matrix protein (M) and nucleoprotein (N):

The VSIV G protein, also known as VSVG or VSV-G, enables viral entry. It mediates viral attachment to an LDL receptor (LDLR) or an LDLR family member present on the host cell. Following binding, the VSIV-LDLR complex is rapidly endocytosed. It then mediates fusion of the viral envelope with the endosomal membrane. VSIV enters the cell through partially clathrin-coated vesicles; virus-containing vesicles contain more clathrin and clathrin adaptor than conventional vesicles. Virus-containing vesicles recruit components of the actin machinery for their interaction, thus inducing their own uptake. VSIV G does not follow the same path as most vesicles because transport of the G protein from the ER to the plasma membrane is interrupted by incubation at 15 °C. Under this condition, the molecules accumulate in both the ER and a subcellular vesicle fraction of low density called the lipid-rich vesicle fraction. The material in the lipid-rich vesicle fraction appears to be a post-ER intermediate in the transport process to the plasma membrane (PM). After infection, the VSIV G gene is expressed and is commonly studied as a model for N-linked glycosylation in the endoplasmic reticulum (ER). It is translated into the rough ER where the Glc_{3}-Man_{9}-GlcNac_{2} oligosaccharide is added by a dolichol-containing protein, to an NXS motif on VSIV G. Sugars are removed gradually as the protein travels to the Golgi apparatus, and it becomes resistant to endoglycosidase H. When synthesized in polarized epithelial cells, the envelope glycoprotein VSV G is targeted to the basolateral PM. VSVG is also a common coat protein for lentiviral vector expression systems used to introduce genetic material into in vitro systems or animal models, mainly because of its extremely broad tropism.

The VSIV L protein is encoded by half the genome, and combines with the phosphoprotein to catalyze replication of the mRNA.

The VSIV M protein is encoded by an mRNA that is 831 nucleotides long and translates to a 229 amino acid-protein. The predicted M protein sequence does not contain any long hydrophobic or nonpolar domains that might promote membrane association. The protein is rich in basic amino acids and contains a highly basic amino terminal domain.

The VSV N protein is required to initiate genome synthesis.

== Vesicular stomatitis ==
=== Clinical signs and diagnosis ===
The main sign in animals is oral disease appearing as mucosal vesicles and ulcers in the mouth, but also on the udder and around the coronary band. Animals may show systemic signs such as anorexia, lethargy and pyrexia (fever). Disease usually resolves within two weeks, and animals usually recover completely.

Cases of human infection with vesicular stomatitis virus have been described. Most of these cases have been among laboratory workers, veterinarians, and livestock handlers. In most cases, VSV infection has resulted in a short 3 to 5 day illness characterized by fever, headache, myalgia, weakness and occasionally vesicular lesions of the mouth. Serological testing is most commonly performed with an ELISA or complement fixation, and viral isolation can also be attempted.

=== Treatment and control ===
No specific treatment is available, but some animals may require supportive fluids or antibiotics for secondary infections.

Control relies on biosecurity protocols, quarantine, isolation and disinfection to ensure the viral disease does not enter a country or herd.

== Medical applications ==
=== Oncolytic therapy ===
In healthy human cells the virus cannot reproduce, likely because of the interferon response, which allows the cells to adequately respond to viral infection. The same cannot be said of interferon non-responsive cancer cells, a quality which allows VSIV to grow and lyse oncogenic cells preferentially.

Recently, attenuated VSIV with a mutation in its M protein has been found to have oncolytic properties. Research is ongoing, and has shown VSIV to reduce tumor size and spread in melanoma, lung cancer, colon cancer and certain brain tumors in laboratory models of cancer.

=== Anti-HIV therapy ===
VSIV was modified to attack HIV-infected T-cells. The modified virus was called a "trojan horse" virus.

=== Recombinant vaccines ===
VSV can be modified to have the surface glycoprotein gene of distantly-related viruses instead of its own. The resulting virus can still replicate on its own in cell cultures but does not effectively infect or spread among animals. It retains a relatively high growth rate in cell culture, which is desirable for vaccine or protein production. Recombinant VSV with Ebola virus, Lassa fever, and Marburg virus glycoproteins have been made.

==== Ebola vaccine ====
It was reported in 2004 that the Ebola-rVSV protected mice against future exposure to lethal doses of the Ebola virus.

In December 2019, Merck & Co.'s rVSV-ZEBOV vaccine Ervebo was approved by the Food and Drug Administration to treat individuals 18 and older. This vaccine is a replication-competent rVSV with Ebola glycoprotein genes. It was shown to be 76-100% effective in preventing Ebola virus disease. Phase 1 trials were completed in 2016.

== Other applications ==
The VSIV G protein is routinely used in biomedical research to pseudotype retroviral and lentiviral vectors, conferring the ability to transduce a broad range of mammalian cell types with genes of interest.

The VSIV G protein has also been used in cytological studies of trafficking in the endomembrane system. Immunoelectron microscopy suggests that VSIV G protein moves from cis to trans Golgi bodies without being transported between them in vesicles, supporting the cisternal maturation model of Golgi trafficking.

VSV is often used to perform quantitative and computational studies on viral genome replication and transcription. Such studies help build a better understanding of viral behavior in the presence and absence of innate immune response.

In 2020, a possible vaccine against COVID-19, the disease caused by SARS-CoV-2, was developed based on modified VSV. The modification involved replacing the VSV's surface protein genes with those for SARS-CoV-2's spike proteins.

== See also ==
- Vesiculovirus matrix proteins
- Viral neuronal tracing
- rVSV-ZEBOV vaccine
