= Lispiviridae =

Virus classification
- (unranked): Virus
- Realm: Riboviria
- Kingdom: Orthornavirae
- Phylum: Negarnaviricota
- Class: Monjiviricetes
- Order: Mononegavirales
- Family: Lispiviridae

Genera
- See text

Family of viruses

Lispiviridae is a family of negative-strand RNA viruses. The family includes 31 genera and 51 species.

== Taxonomy ==
The family contains the following genera:

- Acridvirus
- Aleyavirus
- Aleybvirus
- Anicalvirus
- Anidravirus
- Aranavirus
- Aranbvirus
- Arlivirus
- Artemvirus
- Avesvirus
- Birfecvirus
- Canmovirus
- Copasivirus
- Coroavirus
- Crocevirus
- Cybitervirus
- Damravirus
- Ganiavirus
- Hemipvirus
- Leocovirus
- Nematovirus
- Phelinovirus
- Rivapovirus
- Robevirus
- Sanstrivirus
- Stylovirus
- Supelovirus
- Synelinevirus
- Usmuvirus
- Weflthvirus
- Xenophyvirus
