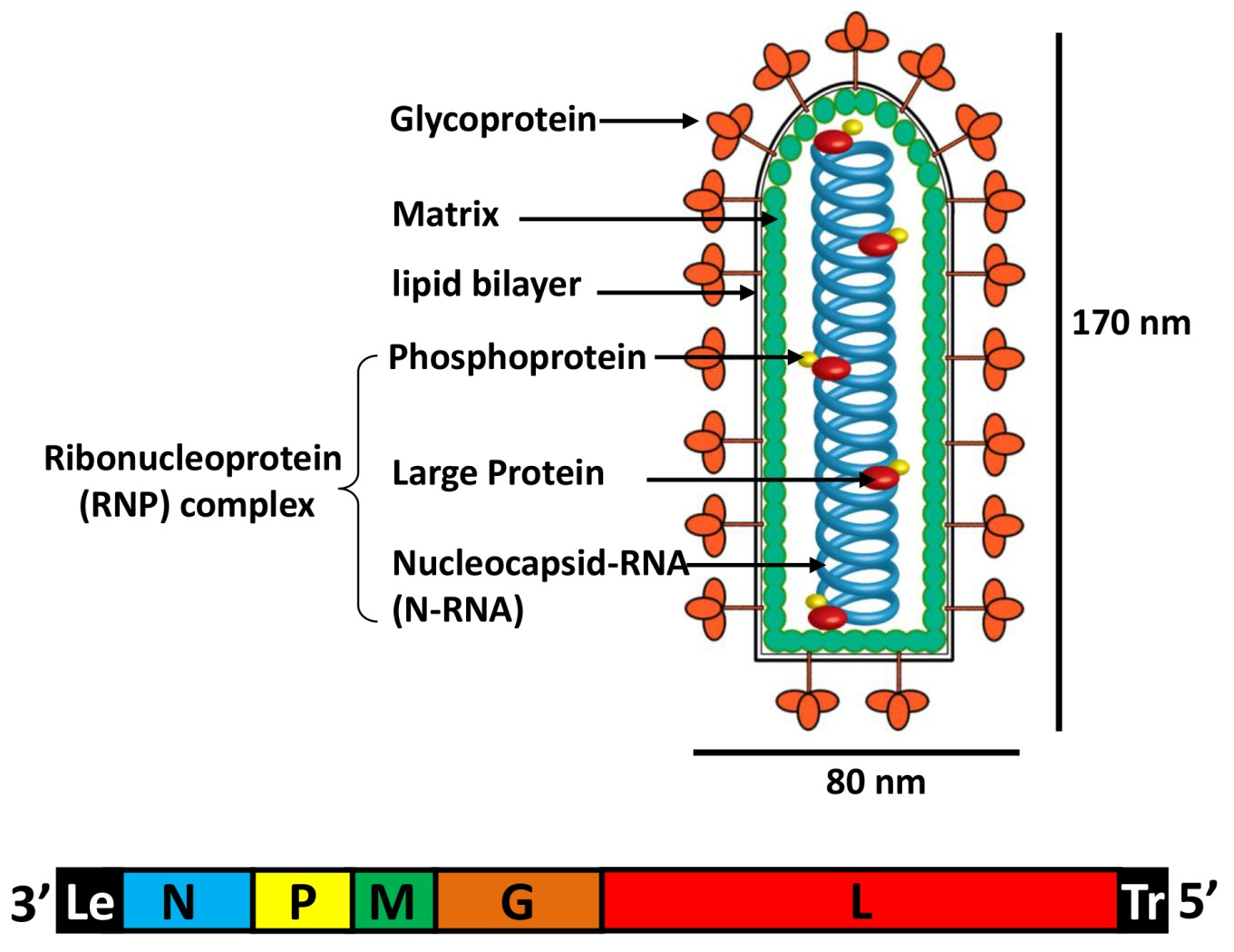
- Vesicular stomatitis Indiana virus (VSV), the prototypical rhabdovirus

Virus classification
- (unranked): Virus
- Realm: Riboviria
- Kingdom: Orthornavirae
- Phylum: Negarnaviricota
- Class: Monjiviricetes
- Order: Mononegavirales
- Family: Rhabdoviridae

Genera
- See text

= Rhabdoviridae =

Family of viruses in the order Mononegavirales

Rhabdoviridae is a family of negative-strand RNA viruses in the order Mononegavirales. Vertebrates (including mammals), invertebrates, plants, fungi, and protozoans serve as natural hosts. Diseases associated with member viruses include rabies encephalitis caused by the rabies virus, and flu-like symptoms in humans caused by vesiculoviruses. The name is derived from Ancient Greek rhabdos, meaning rod, referring to the shape of the viral particles. The family has 64 genera, most of which are assigned to four subfamilies.

== Structure ==
The individual virus particles (virions) of rhabdoviruses are composed of RNA, protein, carbohydrate, and lipids. They have complex bacilliform or bullet-like shapes. All these viruses have structural similarities and have been classified as a single family.

The virions are about 75 nm wide and 180 nm long. Rhabdoviruses are enveloped and have helical nucleocapsids and their genomes are linear, around 11–15 kb in length. Rhabdoviruses carry their genetic material in the form of negative-sense single-stranded RNA. They typically carry genes for five proteins: large protein (L), glycoprotein (G), nucleoprotein (N), phosphoprotein (P), and matrix protein (M). The sequence of these protein genes from the 3 'end to the 5' end in the genome is N–P–M–G–L. Every rhabdovirus encodes these five proteins in their genomes. In addition to these proteins, many rhabdoviruses encode one or more proteins. The first four genes encode major structural proteins that participate in the structure of the virion envelope.

The matrix protein (M) constitutes a layer between the virion envelope and the nucleocapsid core of the rhabdovirus. In addition to its functions in virus assembly, morphogenesis, and budding off enveloped from the host plasma membrane, additional functions such as regulation of RNA synthesis and establishing balance between replication and transcription products, were found for M protein through reverse genetics experiments with rabies virus, a member of the family Rhabdoviridae. The large (L) protein has multiple domains and several enzymatic functions in viral RNA synthesis and processing. In addition to RNA synthesis, it is thought to be involved in methyl capping and polyadenylation activity.

The multifunctional P protein is encoded by the P gene. P protein plays important and multiple roles during transcription and replication of the RNA genome. P protein acts as a non-catalytic cofactor of large protein polymerase. It is binding to N and L protein. P protein has two independent binding regions. By forming N-P complexes, it can keep the N protein in the form suitable for specific encapsulation. P protein interferes with the host's innate immune system through inhibition of the activities of interferon regulatory factor 3 (IRF3) and signal transducer and activator of transcription 1 (STAT1), thus eliminating the cellular type 1 interferon pathway. P protein also acts as an antagonist against antiviral PML function.

In contrast to paramyxoviruses, rhabdoviruses do not have hemagglutinating and neuraminidase activities.

== Transcription ==
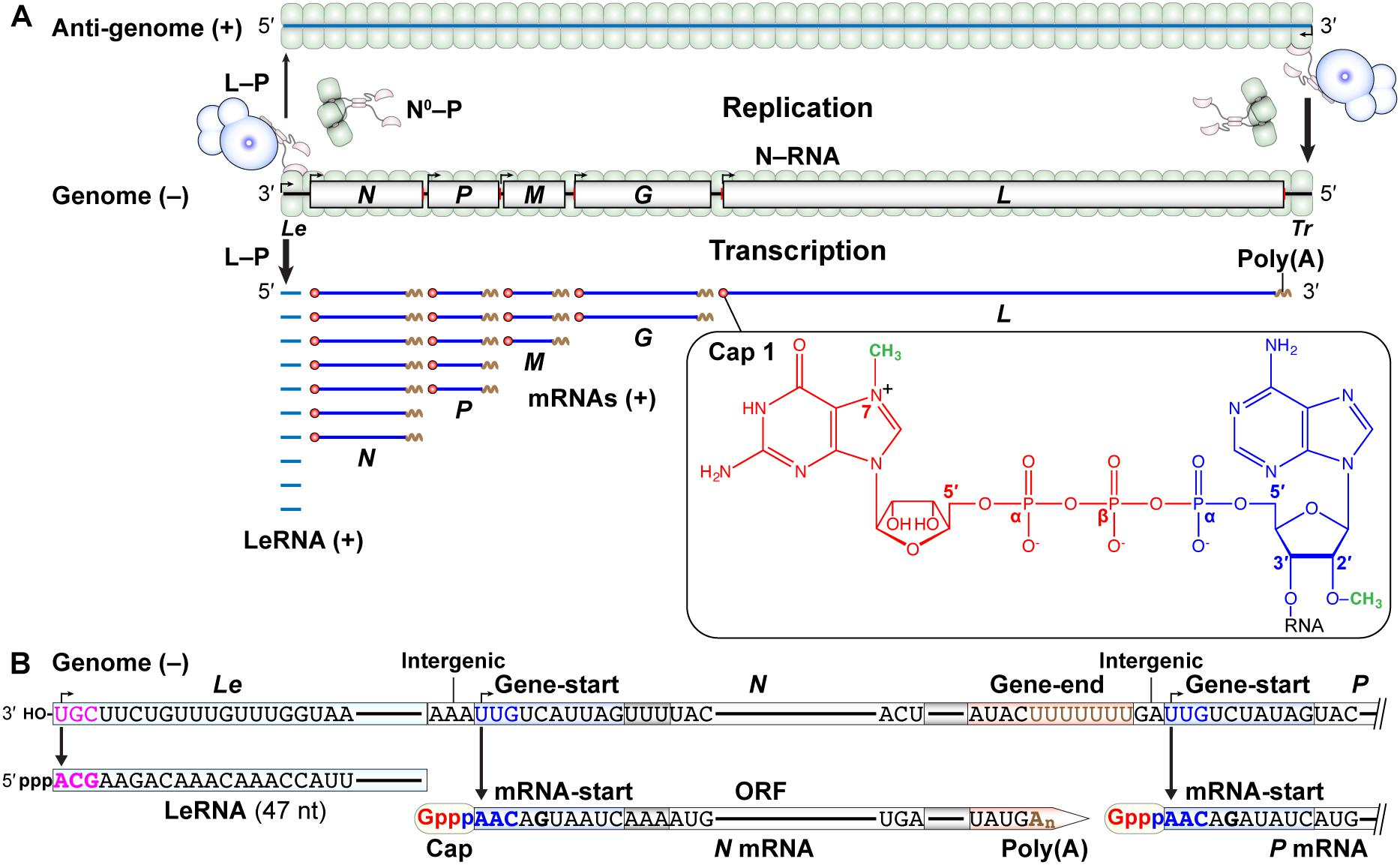
Transcription and replication of the vesicular stomatitis virus genome

Transcriptase of rhabdovirus is composed of 1 L and 3 P proteins. Transcriptase components are always present in the complete virion to permit rhabdoviruses to begin transcription immediately after entry.

The rhabdovirus transcriptase proceeds in a 3' to 5' direction on the genome and the transcription terminates randomly at the end of protein sequences. For example, if a transcription finishes at the end of M sequence; leader RNA and N, P, and M mRNAs are formed separately from each other.

mRNAs also accumulate according to the order of protein sequences on the genome, solving the logistics problem in the cell. For example, N protein is necessary in high quantities for the virus, as it coats the outside of the replicated genomes completely. Since the N protein sequence is located at the beginning of the genome (3' end) after the leader RNA sequence, mRNAs for N protein can always be produced and accumulate in high amounts with every termination of transcription. After the transcription processes, all of the mRNAs are capped at the 5' end and polyadenylated at the 3' end by L protein.

This transcription mechanism thus provides mRNAs according to the need of the viruses.

== Translation ==
The virus proteins are translated on free ribosomes but G protein is translated by the rough endoplasmic reticulum. This means G protein has a signal peptide on its mRNA's starting codes. Phosphoproteins (P) and glycoprotein (G) undergo post-translational modification. Trimers of P protein are formed after phosphorylation by kinase activity of L protein. The G protein is glycosylated in the rough endoplasmic reticulum and the Golgi complex.

== Replication ==
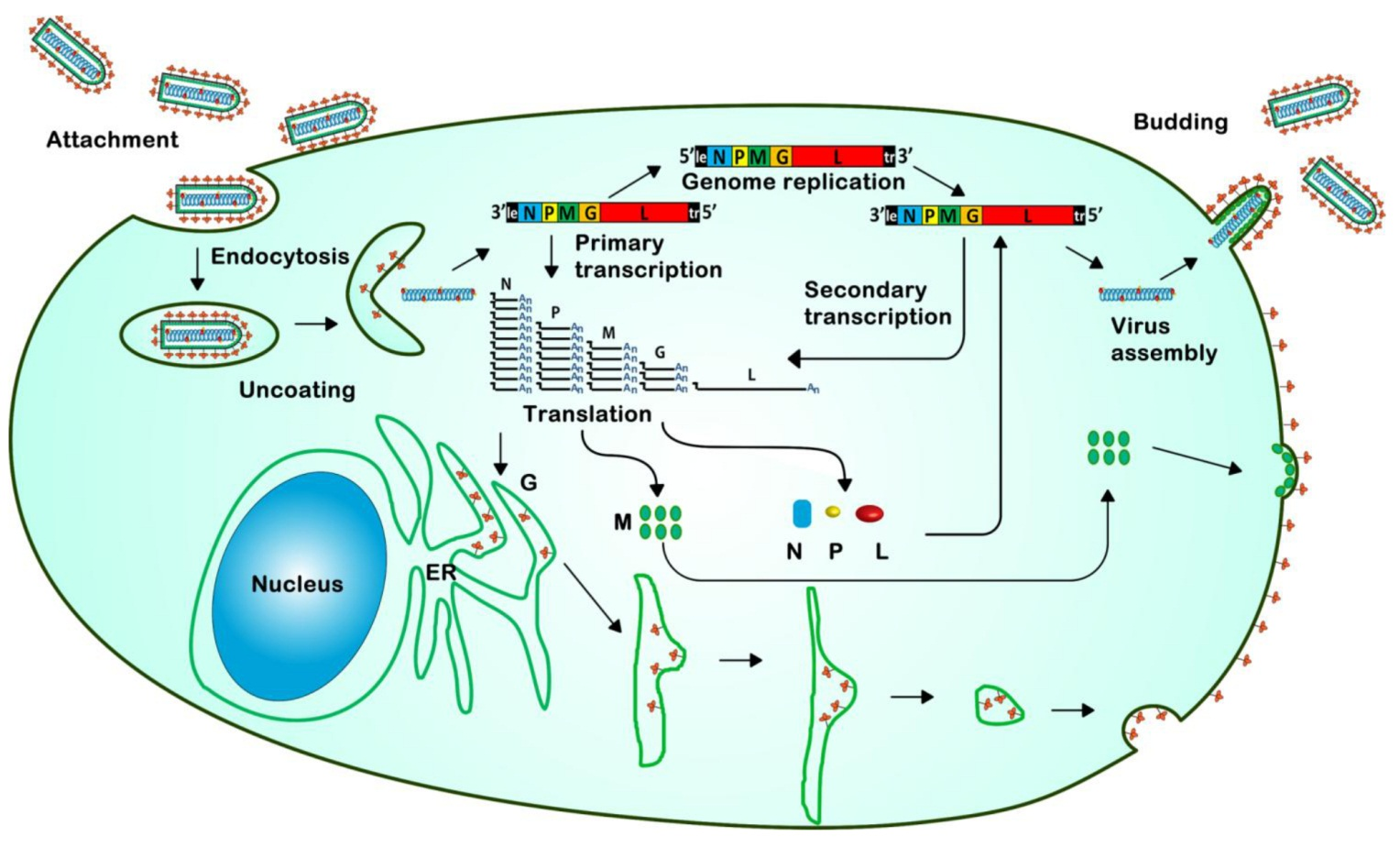
Replication cycle of vesicular stomatitis virus (VSV)

Viral replication is cytoplasmic. The replication cycle is the same for most rhabdoviruses. All components required for early transcription and the nucleocapsid are released to the cytoplasm of the infected cell after the first steps of binding, penetration, and uncoating take place. Entry into the host cell is achieved by attachment of the viral G glycoproteins to host receptors, which mediates clathrin-mediated endocytosis. Replication follows the negative-stranded RNA virus replication model. Negative-stranded RNA virus transcription, using polymerase stuttering, is the method of transcription. The virus exits the host cell by budding and tubule-guided viral movement.

Replication of many rhabdoviruses occurs in the cytoplasm, although several of the plant infecting viruses replicate in the nucleus. The rhabdovirus matrix (M) protein is very small (~20–25 kDa), however it plays a number of important roles during the replication cycle of the virus. These proteins of rhabdoviruses constitute major structural components of the virus and they are multifunctional proteins and required for virus maturation and viral budding process that also regulate the balance of virus RNA synthesis by shifting synthesis from transcription to replication. In order for replication, both the L and P protein must be expressed to regulate transcription. Phosphoprotein (P) also plays a crucial role during replication, as N-P complexes, rather than N alone, are necessary for appropriate and selective encapsidation of viral RNA. Therefore, replication is not possible after infection until the primary transcription and translation produce enough N protein.

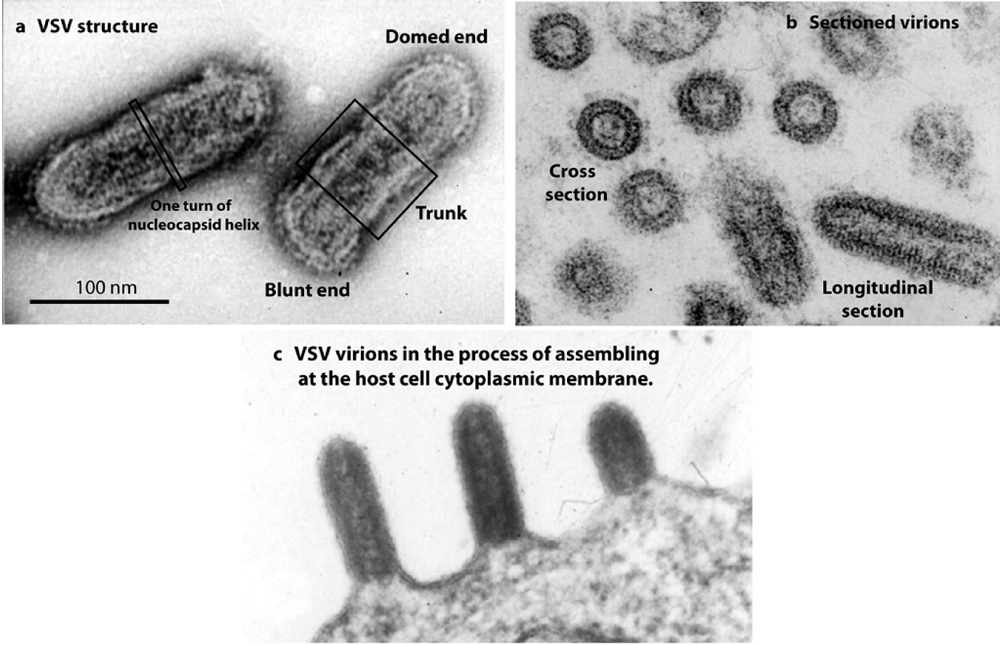
Electron micrograph illustrating the VSV structure and assembly

The L protein performs multiple different types of enzymatic activity including: RNA replication, mRNA capping, and phosphorylation of the P protein. Transcription results in five monocistronic mRNAs being produced because the intergenic sequences act as both termination and promoter sequences for adjacent genes. This type of transcription mechanism is explained by stop-start model (stuttering transcription). Owing to stop-start model, the large amounts of the structural proteins are produced. According to this model, the virus-associated RNA polymerase starts firstly the synthesis of leader RNA and then the five mRNA which will produce N, P, M, G, L proteins, respectively. After the leader RNA was produced, the polymerase enzyme reinitiates virion transcription on N gene and proceeds its synthesis until it ends 3′ end of the chain. Then, the synthesis of P mRNAs are made by same enzyme with new starter signal. These steps continue until the enzyme arrives the end of the L gene. During transcription process, the polymerase enzyme may leave the template at any point and then binds just at the 3′ end of the genome RNA to start mRNA synthesis again. This process results in a concentration gradient in the amount of mRNA based on its place and its range from the 3′ end. In the circumstances, the amounts of mRNA species change and will be produced N>P>M>G>L proteins. During their synthesis, the mRNAs are processed to introduce a 5' cap and a 3’ polyadenylated tail to each of the molecules. This structure is homologous to cellular mRNAs and can thus be translated by cellular ribosomes to produce both structural and non-structural proteins.

Genomic replication requires a source of newly synthesized N protein to encapsidate the RNA. This occurs during its synthesis and results in the production of a full-length anti-genomic copy. This in turn is used to produce more negative-sense genomic RNA. The viral polymerase is required for this process, but how the polymerase engages in both mRNA synthesis and genomic replication is not well understood.

Replication characteristically occurs in an inclusion body within the cytoplasm, from where they bud through various cytoplasmic membranes and the outer membrane of the cell. This process results in the acquisition of the M + G proteins, responsible for the characteristic bullet-shaped morphology of the virus.

== Classification ==
=== Clades ===
Rhabdoviruses fall into four groups based on the RNA polymerase gene. The basal clade appears to be novirhabdoviruses, which infect fish. Cytorhabdoviruses and nucleorhabdoviruses, which infect plants, are sister clades. Lyssaviruses form a clade of their own which is more closely related to the land vertebrate and insect clades than to the plant viruses. The remaining viruses form a number of highly branched clades and infect arthropods and land vertebrates.

=== Proposed classifications ===
An unofficial supergroup – "Dimarhabdovirus" – refers to the genera Ephemerovirus and Vesiculovirus. A number of other viruses that have not been classified into genera also belong to this taxon. This supergroup contains the genera with species that replicate in both vertebrate and invertebrate hosts and have biological cycles that involve transmission by haematophagous dipterans (bloodsucking flies).

=== Prototypical rhabdoviruses ===
The prototypical and best studied rhabdovirus is vesicular stomatitis Indiana virus. It is a preferred model system to study the biology of rhabdoviruses and mononegaviruses in general. The mammalian disease rabies is caused by lyssaviruses, of which several have been identified.

Rhabdoviruses are important pathogens of animals and plants. Rhabdoviruses are transmitted to hosts by arthropods, such as aphids, planthoppers, leafhoppers, black flies, sandflies, and mosquitoes. Transmission routes are zoonosis and bite.

In September 2012, researchers writing in the journal PLOS Pathogens described a novel species of rhabdovirus, called Bas-Congo virus (BASV), which was discovered in a blood sample from a patient who survived an illness that resembled hemorrhagic fever. No cases of BASV have been reported since its discovery and it is uncertain if BASV was the actual cause of the patient's illness.

In 2015, two novel rhabdoviruses, Ekpoma virus 1 and Ekpoma virus 2, were discovered in samples of blood from two healthy women in southwestern Nigeria. Ekpoma virus 1 and Ekpoma virus 2 appear to replicate well in humans (viral load ranged from ~45,000 to ~4.5 million RNA copies/mL plasma) but did not cause any observable symptoms of disease. Exposure to Ekpoma virus 2 appears to be widespread in certain parts of Nigeria where seroprevalence rates are close to 50%.

== Taxonomy ==
In the Alpharhabdovirinae subfamily, the following genera are recognized:

- Almendravirus
- Alphanemrhavirus
- Alphapaprhavirus
- Alpharicinrhavirus
- Alphathriprhavirus
- Amplylivirus
- Artemrhavirus
- Arurhavirus
- Barhavirus
- Betathriprhavirus
- Caligrhavirus
- Cetarhavirus
- Chiroprhavirus
- Curiovirus
- Ephemerovirus
- Hapavirus
- Ledantevirus
- Lostrhavirus
- Lyssavirus
- Merhavirus
- Mousrhavirus
- Ohlsrhavirus
- Perhabdovirus
- Replylivirus
- Sawgrhavirus
- Scophrhavirus
- Sigmavirus
- Siniperhavirus
- Sprivivirus
- Sripuvirus
- Sunrhavirus
- Tibrovirus
- Tupavirus
- Uniorhavirus
- Vesiculovirus
- Zarhavirus

The genera of the other subfamilies are listed hereafter (-virinae denotes subfamily and -virus denotes genus):

- Betarhabdovirinae
  - Alphacytorhabdovirus
  - Alphagymnorhavirus
  - Alphanucleorhabdovirus (currently; see nucleorhabdovirus)
  - Betacytorhabdovirus
  - Betagymnorhavirus
  - Betanucleorhabdovirus (currently; see nucleorhabdovirus)
  - Deltanucleorhabdovirus
  - Dichorhavirus
  - Gammacytorhabdovirus
  - Gammanucleorhabdovirus (currently; see nucleorhabdovirus)
  - Trirhavirus
  - Varicosavirus
- Deltarhabdovirinae
  - Alphacrustrhavirus
  - Alphadrosrhavirus
  - Alphahymrhavirus
  - Betahymrhavirus
  - Betanemrhavirus
  - Betapaprhavirus
  - Betaricinrhavirus
  - Gammahymrhavirus
  - Gammaricinrhavirus
  - Primrhavirus
  - Stangrhavirus
- Gammarhabdovirinae
  - Margarhavirus
  - Novirhabdovirus

The following genera are unassigned to a subfamily:

- Alphaplatrhavirus
- Betaplatrhavirus
- Gammaplatrhavirus

In addition to the above, there are a large number of rhabdo-like viruses that have not yet been officially classified by the ICTV.

== See also ==
- Rabies
