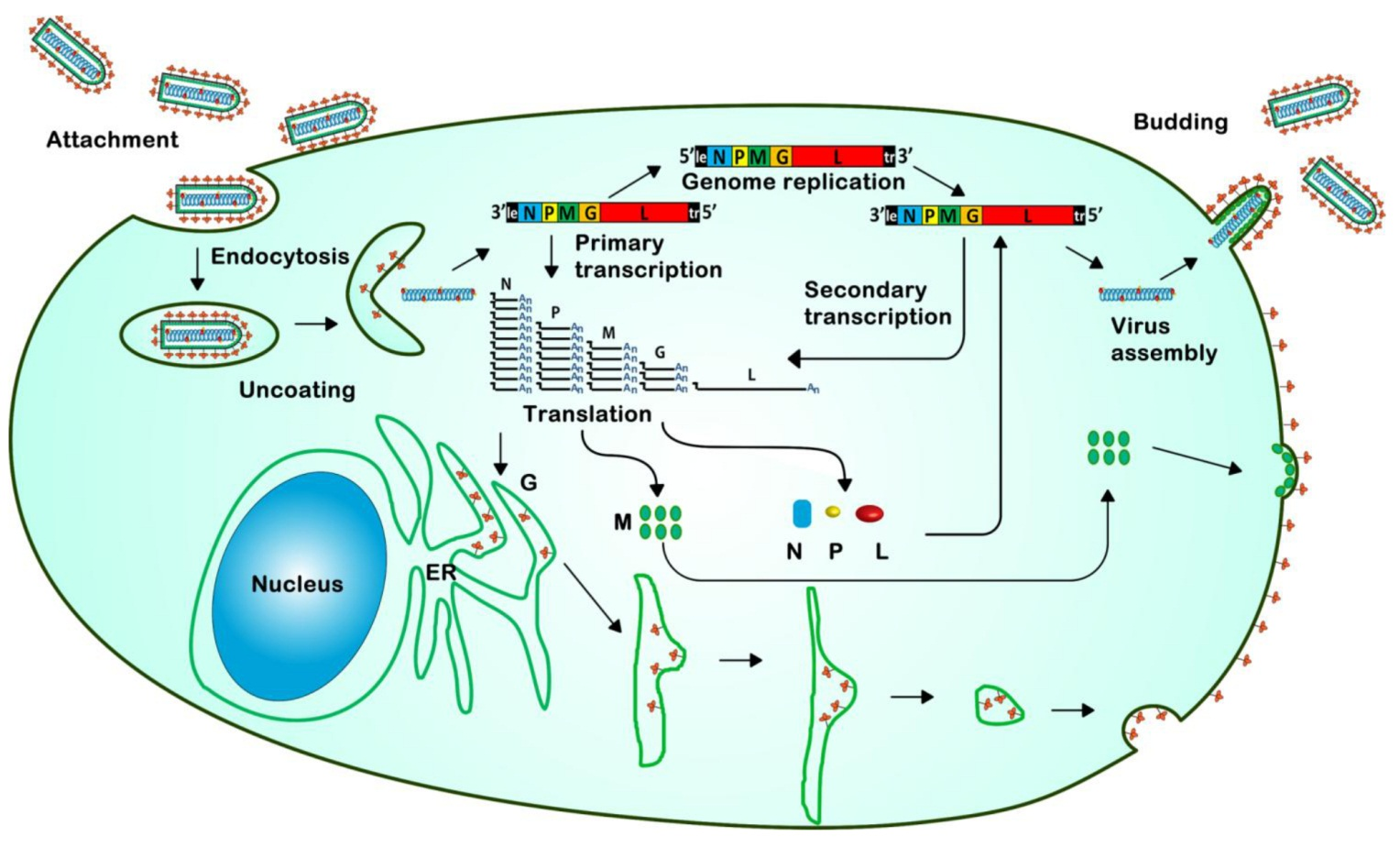
- Life cycle of vesicular stomatitis virus

Virus classification
- (unranked): Virus
- Realm: Riboviria
- Kingdom: Orthornavirae
- Phylum: Negarnaviricota
- Subphylum: Haploviricotina
- Class: Monjiviricetes

Orders and families
- Jingchuvirales; Chuviridae; Mononegavirales; Artoviridae; Bornaviridae; Filoviridae; Lispiviridae; Mymonaviridae; Nyamiviridae; Paramyxoviridae; Pneumoviridae; Rhabdoviridae; Sunviridae; Xinmoviridae

= Monjiviricetes =

Class of viruses

Monjiviricetes is a class of negative-strand RNA viruses which infect fungi, plants, invertebrates, and vertebrates. The name is a portmanteau of the two orders within the class, Mononegavirales and Jingchuvirales and the suffix for a virus class -viricetes.

== Taxonomy ==
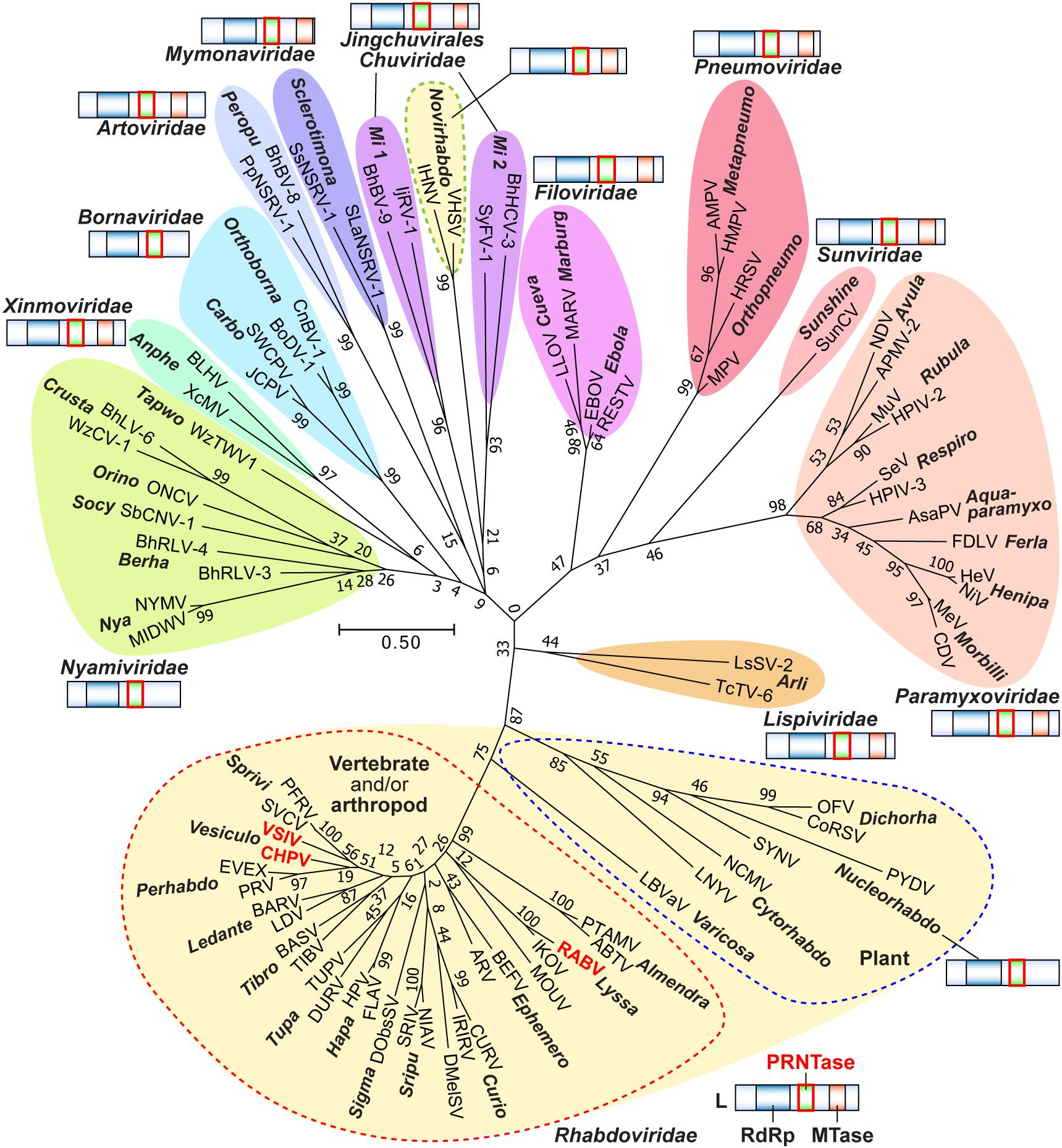
Mononegavirales phylogenetic tree
