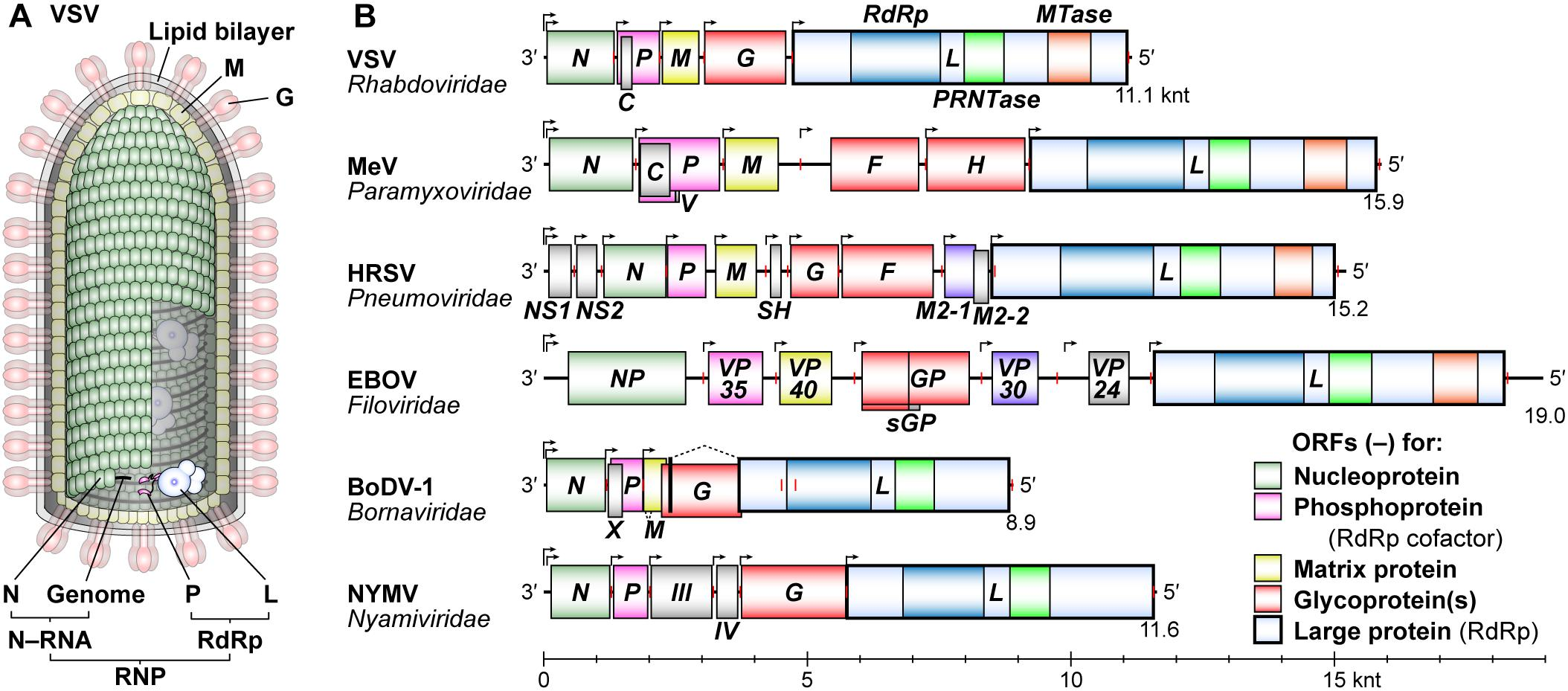
- Vesicular stomatitis virus (VSV) virion and Mononegavirales genomes

Virus classification
- (unranked): Virus
- Realm: Riboviria
- Kingdom: Orthornavirae
- Phylum: Negarnaviricota
- Class: Monjiviricetes
- Order: Mononegavirales

Families
- see text

= Mononegavirales =

Order of viruses

Mononegavirales is an order of negative-strand RNA viruses which have nonsegmented genomes. Some members that cause human disease in this order include Ebola virus, human respiratory syncytial virus, measles virus, mumps virus, Nipah virus, and rabies virus. Important pathogens of nonhuman animals and plants are also in the group. The order includes eleven virus families: Artoviridae, Bornaviridae, Filoviridae, Lispiviridae, Mymonaviridae, Nyamiviridae, Paramyxoviridae, Pneumoviridae, Rhabdoviridae, Sunviridae, and Xinmoviridae.

== Use of term ==
The order Mononegavirales (pronounced: /ˌmɒnəˌnɛɡəviˈrɑːlɪz/ MON-ə-NEG-ə-vee-RAH-liz) (Note: According to the rules for taxon naming established by the International Committee on Taxonomy of Viruses (ICTV), the name Mononegavirales is always to be capitalized, italicized, and never abbreviated. The names of the order's physical members ("mononegaviruses" or "mononegavirads") are to be written in lower case, are not italicized, and used without articles.) is a virological taxon that was created in 1991 and amended in 1995, 1997, 2000, 2005, 2011, 2016, 2017, and 2018. The name Mononegavirales is derived from the Ancient Greek adjective μóνος monos (alluding to the monopartite and single-stranded genomes of most mononegaviruses), the Latin verb negare (alluding to the negative polarity of these genomes), and the taxonomic suffix -virales (denoting a viral order).

== Order inclusion criteria ==
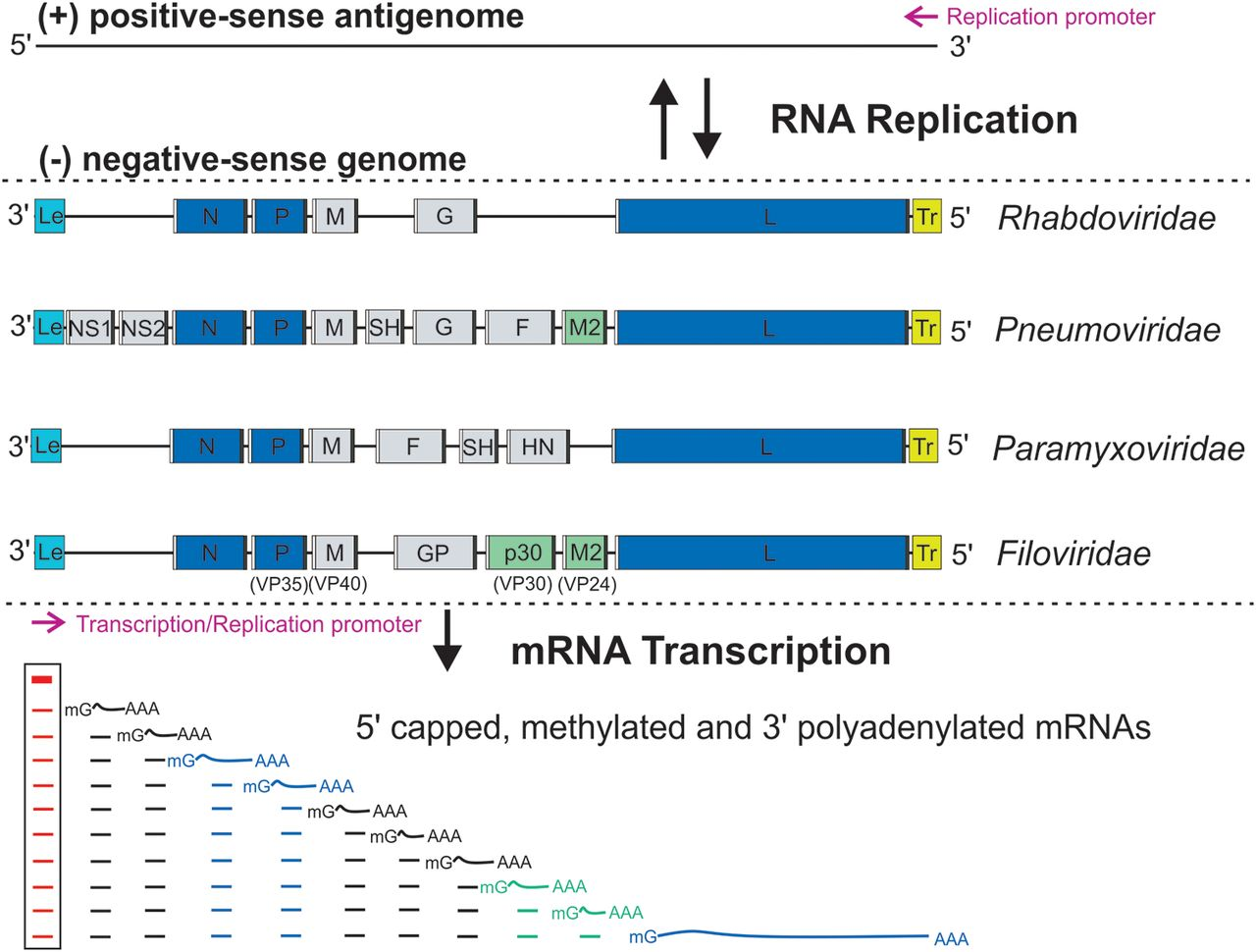
The genome organization and RNA synthesis of order Mononegavirales

A virus is a member of the order Mononegavirales if

- its genome is a linear, typically (but not always) nonsegmented, single-stranded, non-infectious RNA of negative polarity; possesses inverse-complementary 3' and 5' termini; and is not covalently linked to a protein;
- its genome has the characteristic gene order 3'-UTR–core protein genes–envelope protein genes–RNA-dependent RNA polymerase gene–5'-UTR (3'-N-P-M-G-L-5') (there are, however, some exceptions);
- it produces 5–10 distinct mRNAs from its genome via polar sequential transcription from a single promoter located at the 3' end of the genome; mRNAs are 5' capped and polyadenylated;
- it replicates by synthesizing complete antigenomes;
- it forms infectious helical ribonucleocapsids as the templates for the synthesis of mRNAs, antigenomes, and genomes;
- it encodes an RNA-dependent RNA polymerase (RdRp, L) that is highly homologous to those of other mononegaviruses; and/or
- it typically (but not always) produces enveloped virions with a molecular mass of 300–1,000×10^{6}; an S_{20W} of 550–>1,045; and a buoyant density in CsCl of 1.18–1.22 g/cm^{3}.

== Life cycle ==
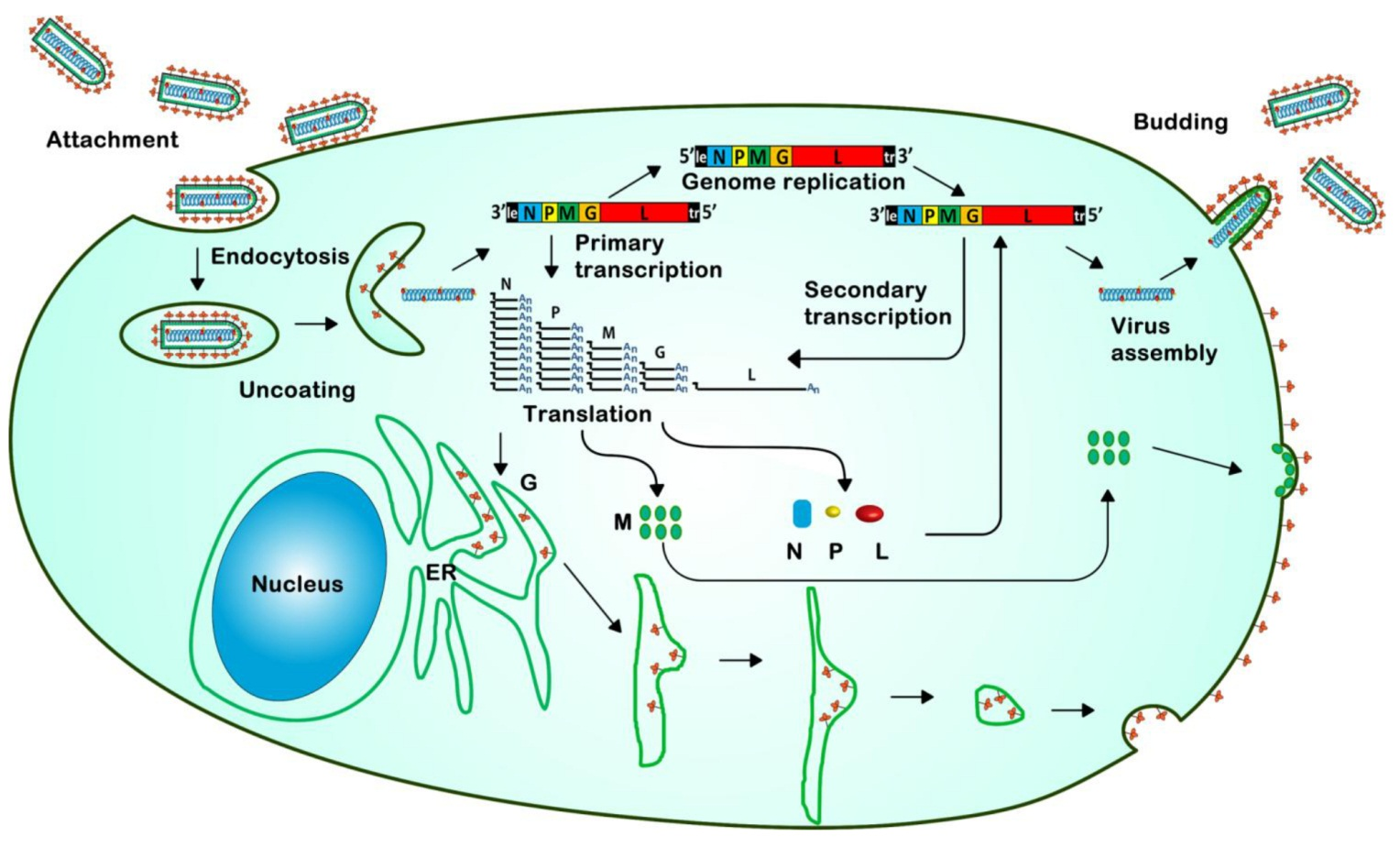
Life cycle of vesiculoviruses

The mononegavirus life cycle begins with virion attachment to specific cell-surface receptors, followed by fusion of the virion envelope with cellular membranes and the concomitant release of the virus nucleocapsid into the cytosol. The virus RdRp partially uncoats the nucleocapsid and transcribes the genes into positive-stranded mRNAs, which are then translated into structural and nonstructural proteins.

Mononegavirus RdRps bind to a single promoter located at the 3' end of the genome. Transcription either terminates after a gene or continues to the next gene downstream. This means that genes close to the 3' end of the genome are transcribed in the greatest abundance, whereas those toward the 5' end are least likely to be transcribed. The gene order is therefore a simple but effective form of transcriptional regulation. The most abundant protein produced is the nucleoprotein, whose concentration in the cell determines when the RdRp switches from gene transcription to genome replication.

Replication results in full-length, positive-stranded antigenomes that are in turn transcribed into negative-stranded virus progeny genome copies. Newly synthesized structural proteins and genomes self-assemble and accumulate near the inside of the cell membrane. Virions bud off from the cell, gaining their envelopes from the cellular membrane they bud from. The mature progeny particles then infect other cells to repeat the cycle.

== Paleovirology ==
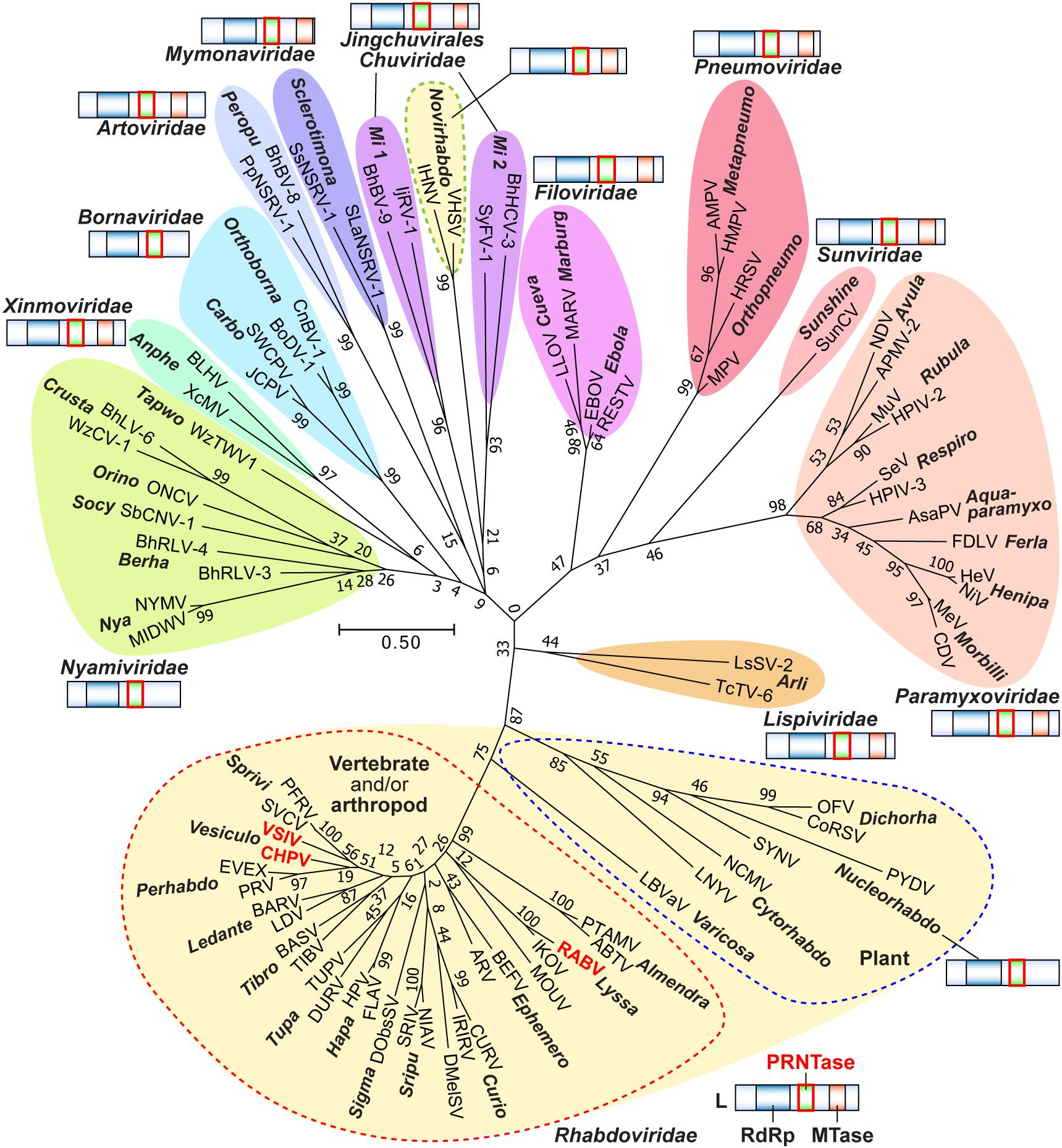
Mononegavirales phylogenetic tree

Mononegaviruses have a history that dates back several tens of millions of years. Mononegavirus "fossils" have been discovered in the form of mononegavirus genes or gene fragments endogenized into mammalian genomes. For instance, bornavirus gene "fossils" have been detected in the genomes of bats, fish, hyraxes, marsupials, primates, rodents, ruminants, and elephants. Filovirus gene "fossils" have been detected in the genomes of bats, rodents, shrews, tenrecs, and marsupials. A Midway virus "fossil" was found in the genome of zebrafish. Finally, rhabdovirus "fossils" were found in the genomes of crustaceans, mosquitoes, ticks, and plants.

== Taxonomy ==
The order contains the following eleven families:

- Artoviridae
- Bornaviridae
- Filoviridae
- Lispiviridae
- Mymonaviridae
- Nyamiviridae
- Paramyxoviridae
- Pneumoviridae
- Rhabdoviridae
- Sunviridae
- Xinmoviridae
