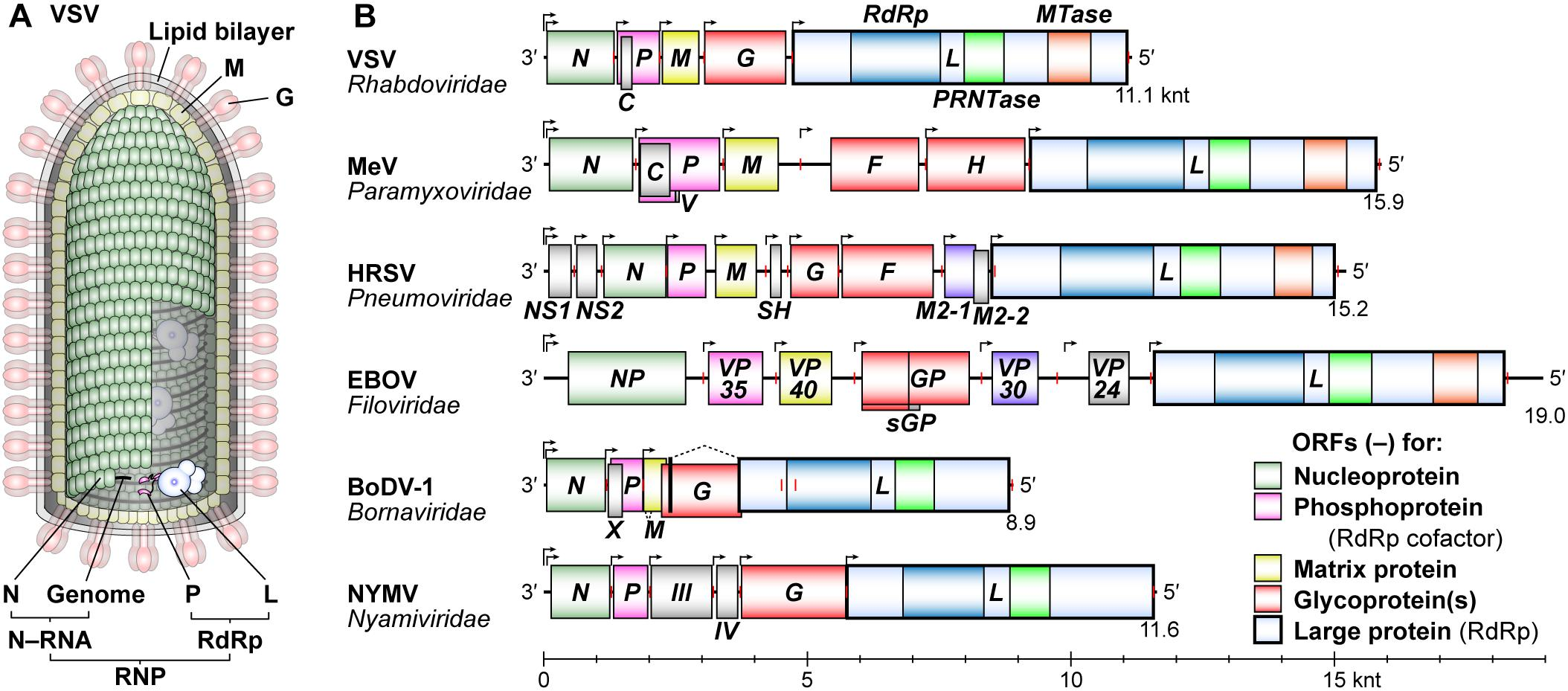
- Vesicular stomatitis virus (VSV) virion and Mononegavirales genomes

Virus classification
- (unranked): Virus
- Realm: Riboviria
- Kingdom: Orthornavirae
- Phylum: Negarnaviricota
- Subphylum: Haploviricotina

Classes and orders
- See text

= Haploviricotina =

Group of viruses

Haploviricotina is a subphylum of viruses in the phylum Negarnaviricota. It is one of only two virus subphyla, the other being Polyploviricotina, which is also in Negarnaviricota. The name comes from ἁπλό haplo, the Ancient Greek for 'simple', along with the suffix for a virus subphylum; 'viricotina'.

== Taxonomy ==
The subphylum Haploviricotina is composed of 4 classes and 5 orders:

- Chunqiuviricetes
  - Muvirales
- Milneviricetes
  - Serpentovirales
- Monjiviricetes
  - Jingchuvirales
  - Mononegavirales
- Yunchangviricetes
  - Goujianvirales
