= Mivirus =

Virus classification
- (unranked): Virus
- Realm: Riboviria
- Kingdom: Orthornavirae
- Phylum: Negarnaviricota
- Class: Monjiviricetes
- Order: Jingchuvirales
- Family: Chuviridae
- Genus: Mivirus

Genus of viruses

Mivirus is a genus of negative-strand RNA viruses which infect arthropods. Member viruses have nonsegmented and bisegmented genomes. There are ten species in the genus.

== Etymology ==
The name Mivirus derives from 芈 (Mǐ), the ancestral name of King Zhuang of Chu during the Spring and Autumn period, along with -virus, the suffix for a virus genus.

== Genome ==
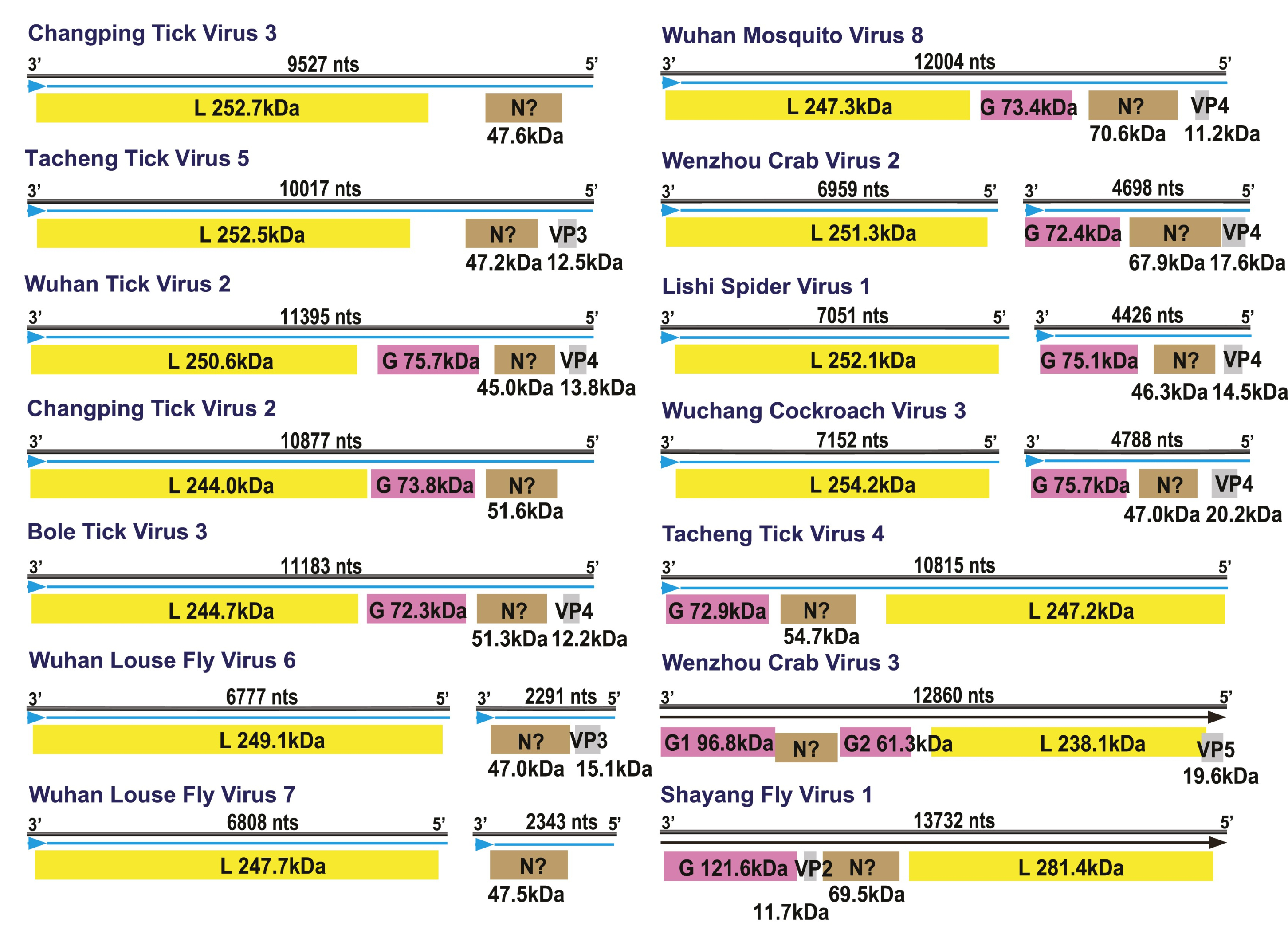
The differing genome organizations in the family Chuviridae

Miviruses have nonsegmented and bisegmented genomes which are linear. Some member viruses may have circular genomes.

== Taxonomy ==
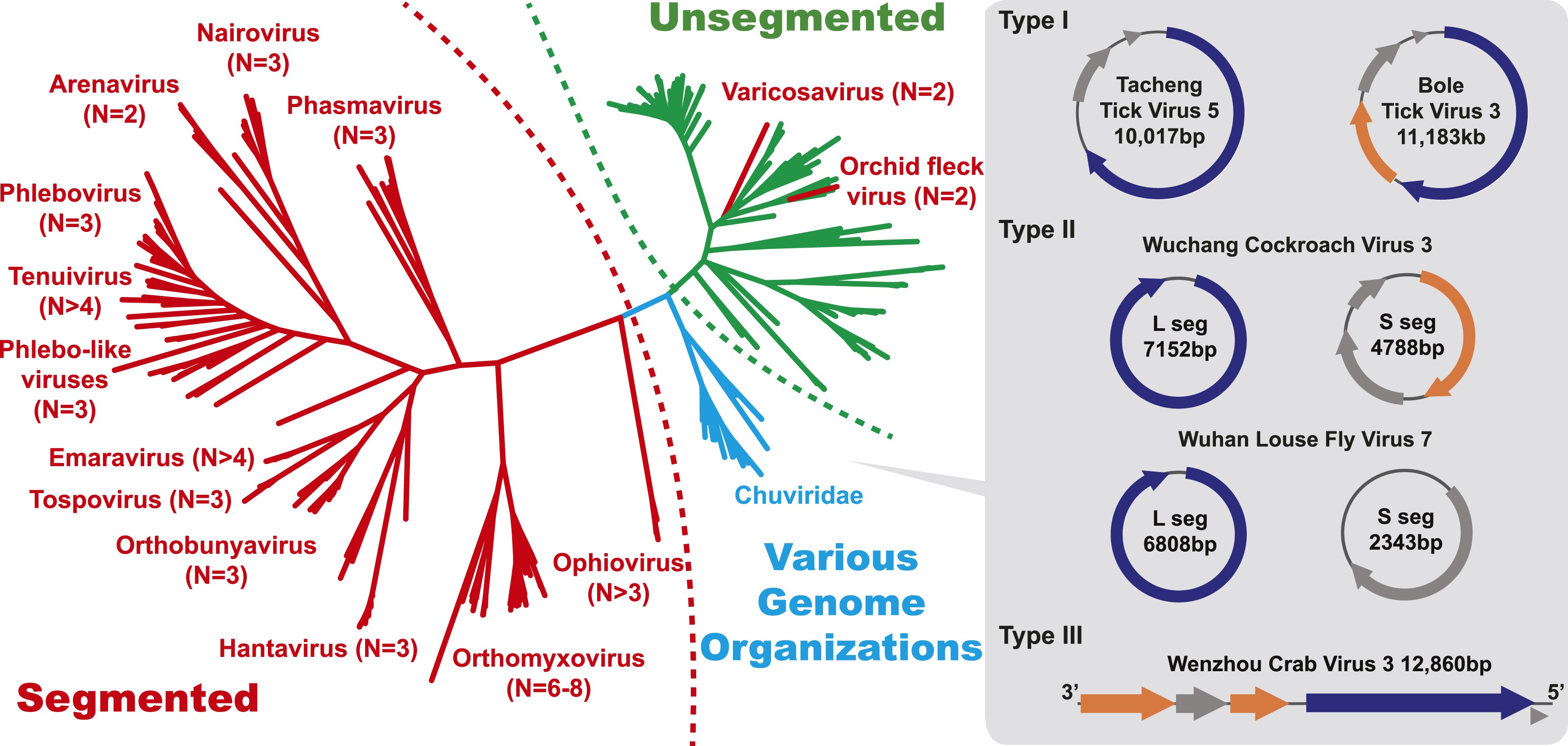
Phylogentic tree of Negarnaviricota with family Chuviridae in blue

The genus contains the following species:

- Mivirus amblyommae
- Mivirus belostomatis
- Mivirus boleense
- Mivirus changpingense
- Mivirus dermacentoris
- Mivirus genovaense
- Mivirus karukeraense
- Mivirus rhipicephali
- Mivirus suffolkense
- Mivirus wuhanense
