= Polymerase stuttering =

Polymerase stuttering is the process by which a polymerase transcribes a nucleotide several times without progressing further on the mRNA chain. It is often used in addition of poly A tails or capping mRNA chains by less complex organisms such as viruses.

== Process ==
A polymerase may undergo stuttering as a probability controlled event, hence it is not explicitly controlled by any mechanisms in the translation process. Generally, it is a result of many short repeated frameshifts on a slippery sequence of nucleotides on the mRNA strand. However, the frameshift is restricted to one (in some cases two) nucleotides with a pseudoknot or choke points on both sides of the sequence.

== Examples ==
A polymerase that exhibits this behavior is RNA-dependent RNA polymerase, present in many RNA viruses. Reverse transcriptase has also been observed to undergo this polymerase stuttering.
