= Tombendovirales =

Virus classification
- (unranked): Virus
- Realm: Riboviria
- Order: Tombendovirales

Order of viruses

Tombendovirales is an order of viruses.

== Taxonomy ==
The order contains the following families:

- Pamosaviridae
- Sarthroviridae
- Tomosaviridae
