= Higrevirus =

Virus classification
- (unranked): Virus
- Realm: Riboviria
- Phylum: incertae sedis
- Family: Kitaviridae
- Genus: Higrevirus

Species
- Hibiscus green spot virus 2

Genus of viruses

Higrevirus is a genus of viruses. Plants serve as natural hosts. There is currently only one species in this genus: the type species Hibiscus green spot virus 2.

== Structure ==
Viruses in Higrevirus are non-enveloped, with bacilliform geometries. These viruses are about 30 nm wide and 50 nm long. Genomes are linear and segmented, tripartite, around 38.43.23.1kb in length.

Genus	Structure	Symmetry	Capsid	Genomic arrangement	Genomic segmentation
Higrevirus	Unknown			Unknown	

== Life cycle ==
Viral replication is cytoplasmic. Entry into the host cell is achieved by penetration into the host cell. Replication follows the positive stranded RNA virus replication model. Positive stranded RNA virus transcription is the method of transcription. Plants serve as the natural host.

Genus	Host details	Tissue tropism	Entry details	Release details	Replication site	Assembly site	Transmission
Higrevirus	Plants	None	Unknown	Unknown	Unknown	Unknown	Unknown
