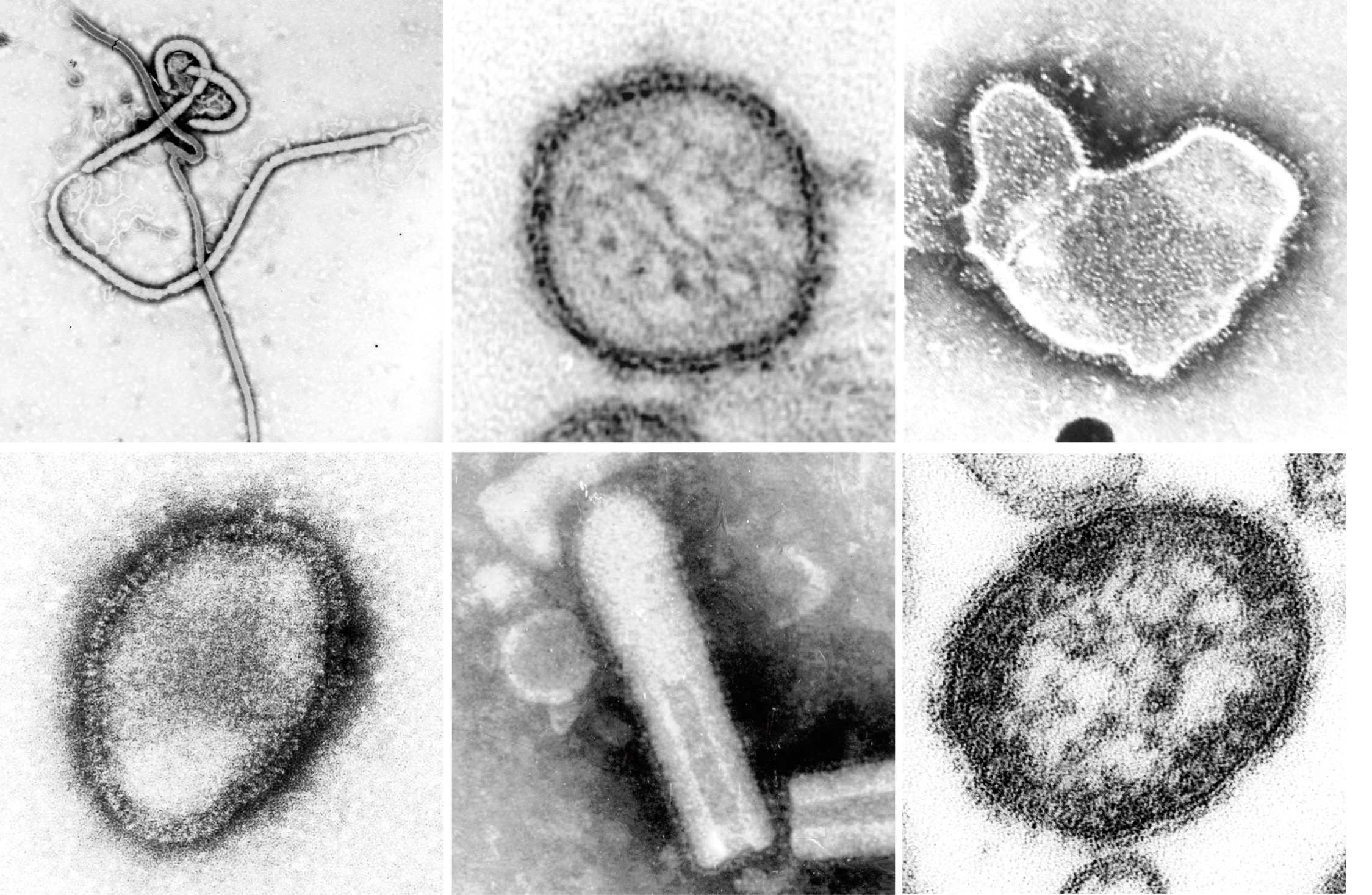
- A montage of transmission electron micrographs of some viruses in the phylum Negarnaviricota. Not to scale. Species from left to right, top to bottom: Zaire ebolavirus, Sin Nombre orthohantavirus, Human orthopneumovirus, Hendra henipavirus, an unidentified rhabdovirus, Measles morbillivirus.

Virus classification
- (unranked): Virus
- Realm: Riboviria
- Kingdom: Orthornavirae
- Phylum: Negarnaviricota

Subtaxa
- See text

Synonyms
- Negative-sense RNA viruses (NSVs) (Note: The hepatitis D virus is often called a virus but can be more specifically described as a virusoid-like pathogenic −ssRNA strand. It is excluded from Negarnaviricota because although it is −ssRNA, it does not encode RdRp, which is the unifying trait of viruses in Orthornavirae.)

= Negative-strand RNA virus =

Negarnaviricota

Phylum of viruses

Negative-strand RNA viruses (−ssRNA viruses) are a group of related viruses that have negative-sense, single-stranded genomes made of ribonucleic acid (RNA). They have genomes that act as complementary strands from which messenger RNA (mRNA) is synthesized by the viral enzyme RNA-dependent RNA polymerase (RdRp). During replication of the viral genome, RdRp synthesizes a positive-sense antigenome that it uses as a template to create genomic negative-sense RNA. Negative-strand RNA viruses also share a number of other characteristics: most contain a viral envelope that surrounds the capsid, which encases the viral genome, −ssRNA virus genomes are usually linear, and it is common for their genome to be segmented.

Negative-strand RNA viruses constitute the phylum Negarnaviricota, in the kingdom Orthornavirae and realm Riboviria. They are descended from a common ancestor that was a double-stranded RNA (dsRNA) virus, and they are considered to be a sister clade of reoviruses, which are dsRNA viruses. Within the phylum, there are two major branches that form two subphyla: Haploviricotina, whose members are mostly non-segmented and which encode an RdRp that synthesizes caps on mRNA, and Polyploviricotina, whose members are segmented and which encode an RdRp that snatches caps from host mRNAs. A total of six classes in the phylum are recognized.

Negative-strand RNA viruses are closely associated with arthropods and can be informally divided between those that are reliant on arthropods for transmission and those that are descended from arthropod viruses but can now replicate in vertebrates without the aid of arthropods. Prominent arthropod-borne −ssRNA viruses include the Rift Valley fever virus and the tomato spotted wilt virus. Notable vertebrate −ssRNA viruses include the Ebola virus, hantaviruses, influenza viruses, the Lassa fever virus, and the rabies virus.

== Etymology ==
Negarnaviricota takes the first part of its name from Latin nega, meaning negative, the middle part rna refers to RNA, and the final part, viricota, is the suffix used for virus phyla. The subphylum Haploviricotina takes the first part of its name, Haplo, from Ancient Greek ἁπλός, meaning simple, and viricotina is the suffix used for virus subphyla. The subphylum Polyploviricotina follows the same pattern, Polyplo being taken from Ancient Greek πολύπλοκος, meaning complex.

== Characteristics ==
=== Genome ===
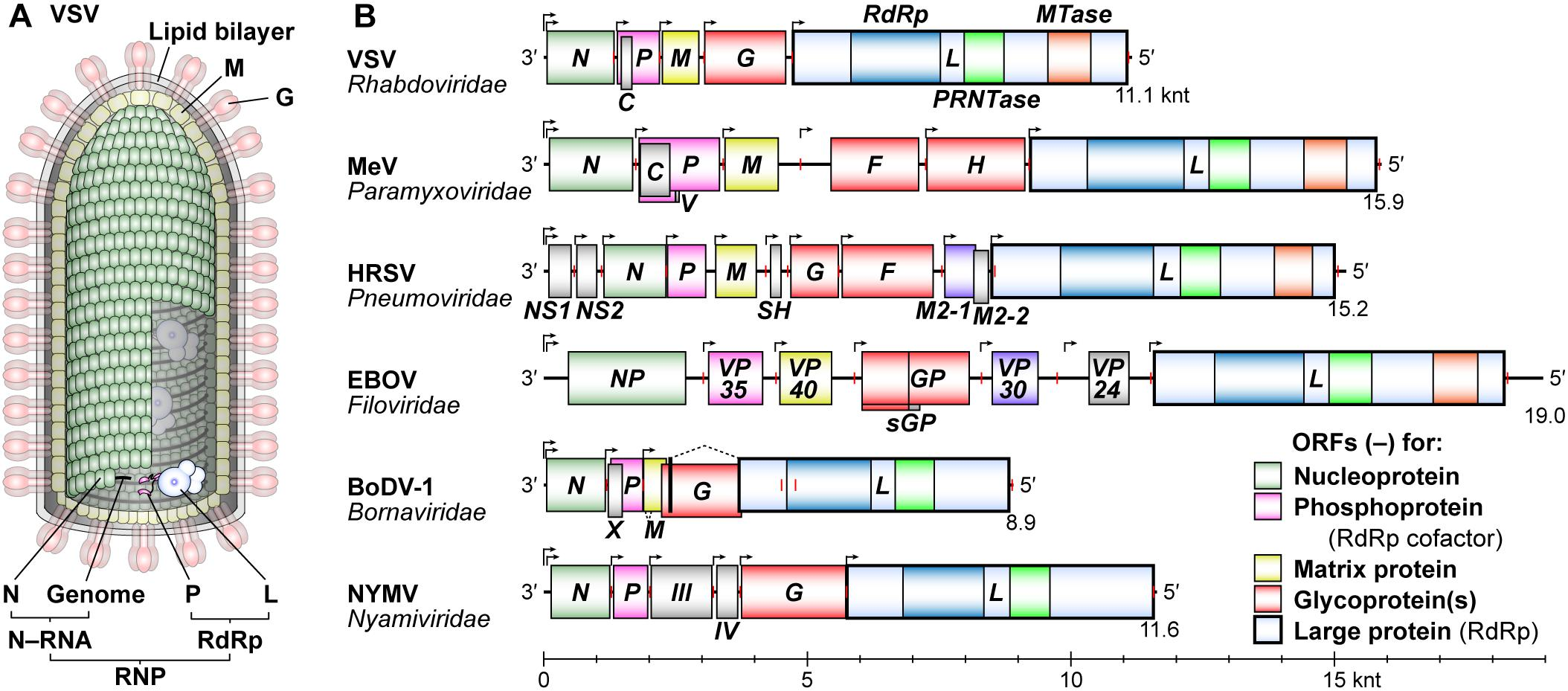
Vesicular stomatitis virus (VSV) virion and Mononegavirales genomes

All viruses in Negarnaviricota are negative-sense, single-stranded RNA (−ssRNA) viruses. They have genomes made of RNA, which are single instead of double-stranded. Their genomes are negative sense, meaning that messenger RNA (mRNA) can be synthesized directly from the genome by the viral enzyme RNA-dependent RNA polymerase (RdRp), also called RNA replicase, which is encoded by all −ssRNA viruses. Excluding viruses in the genus Tenuivirus and some in the family Chuviridae, all −ssRNA viruses have linear rather than circular genomes, and the genomes may be segmented or non-segmented. All −ssRNA genomes contain terminal inverted repeats, which are palindromic nucleotide sequences at each end of the genome.

=== Replication and transcription ===
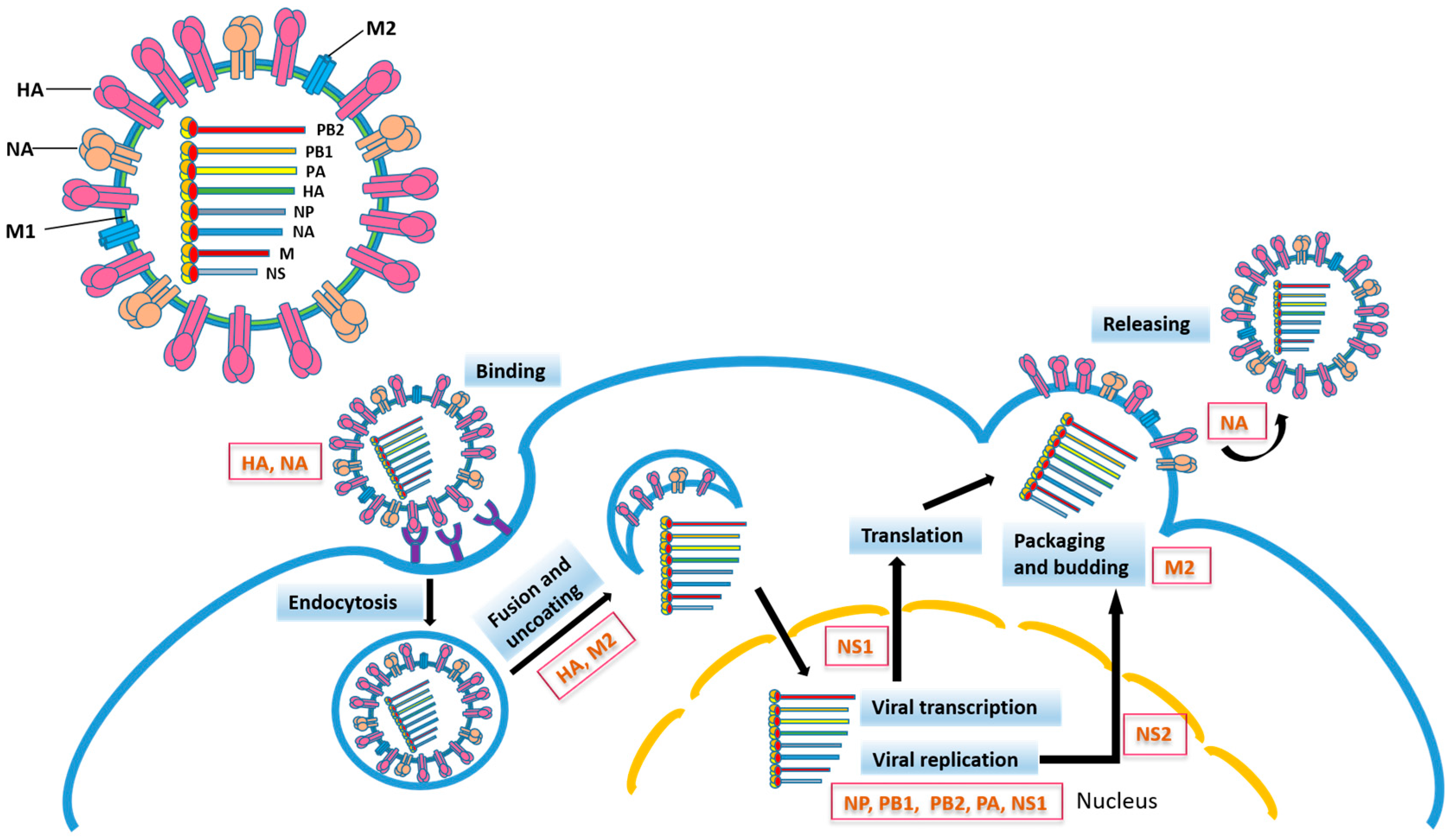
Influenza virus replication cycle

Replication of −ssRNA genomes is executed by RdRp, which initiates replication by binding to a leader sequence on the 3'-end (usually pronounced "three prime end") of the genome. RdRp then uses the negative sense genome as a template to synthesize a positive-sense antigenome. When replicating the antigenome, RdRp first binds to the trailer sequence on the 3'-end of the antigenome. Thereafter, RdRp ignores all transcription signals on the antigenome and synthesizes a copy of the genome while using the antigenome as a template. Replication is executed while the genome is inside the nucleocapsid, and RdRp unveils the capsid and translocates along the genome during replication. As new nucleotide sequences are synthesized by RdRp, capsid proteins are assembled and encapsidate the newly replicated viral RNA.

Transcribing mRNA from the genome follows the same directional pattern as producing the antigenome. At the leader sequence, RdRp synthesizes a 5'-end (usually pronounced "five prime end") triphosphate-leader RNA and either, in the case of the subphylum Haploviricotina, caps the 5'-end or, in the case of the subphylum Polyploviricotina, snatches a cap from a host mRNA and attaches it to the viral mRNA so that the mRNA can be translated by the host cell's ribosomes.

After capping the mRNA, RdRp initiates transcription at a gene start signal and later terminates transcription upon reaching a gene end signal. At the end of transcription, RdRp synthesizes a polyadenylated tail (poly (A) tail) consisting of hundreds of adenines in the mRNA's 3-end, which may be done by stuttering on a sequence of uracils. After the poly (A) tail is constructed, the mRNA is released by RdRp. In genomes that encode more than one transcribable portion, RdRp can continue scanning to the next start sequence to continue with transcription.

Some −ssRNA viruses are ambisense, meaning that both the negative genomic strand and positive antigenome separately encode different proteins. In order to transcribe ambisense viruses, two rounds of transcription are performed: first, mRNA is produced directly from the genome; second, mRNA is created from the antigenome. All ambisense viruses contain a hairpin loop structure to stop transcription after the protein's mRNA has been transcribed.

=== Morphology ===
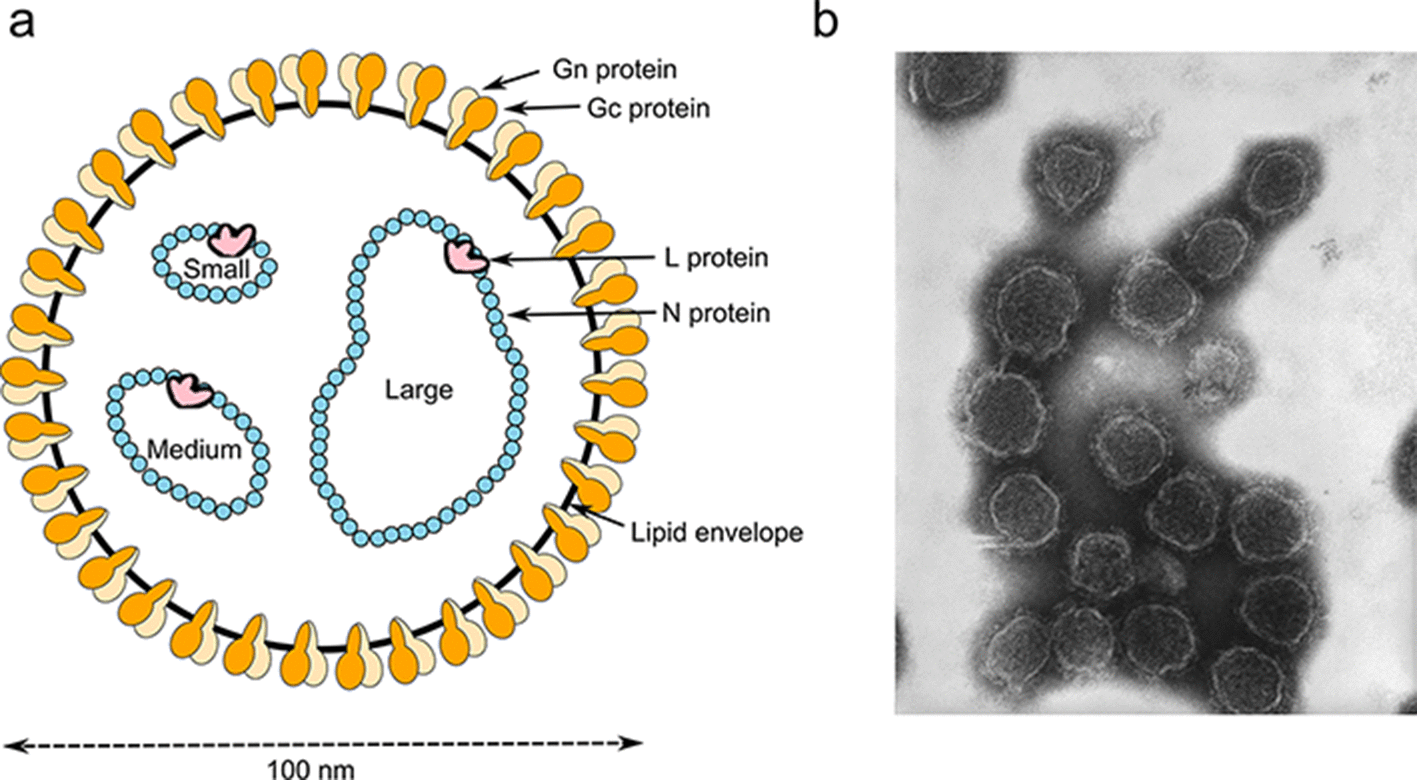
Peribunyavirus structure (left); transmission electron micrograph of California encephalitis virus (right)

Negative-strand RNA viruses contain a ribonucleoprotein complex composed of the genome and an RdRp attached to each segment of the genome surrounded by a capsid. The capsid is composed of proteins whose folded structure contains five alpha-helices in the N-terminal lobe (5-H motif) and three alpha-helices in the C-terminal lobe (3-H motif). Inside the capsid, the genome is sandwiched between these two motifs. Excluding the family Aspiviridae, −ssRNA viruses contain an outer viral envelope, a type of a lipid membrane that surrounds the capsid. The shape of the virus particle, called a virion, of −ssRNA viruses varies and may be filamentous, pleomorphic, spherical, or tubular.

=== Evolution ===
Genome segmentation is a prominent trait among many −ssRNA viruses, and −ssRNA viruses range from having genomes with one segment, typical for members of the order Mononegavirales, to genomes with ten segments, as is the case for Tilapia tilapinevirus. There is no clear trend over time that determines the number of segments, and genome segmentation among −ssRNA viruses appears to be a flexible trait since it has evolved independently on multiple occasions. Most members of the subphylum Haploviricotina are nonsegmented, whereas segmentation is universal in Polyploviricotina.

== Phylogenetics ==
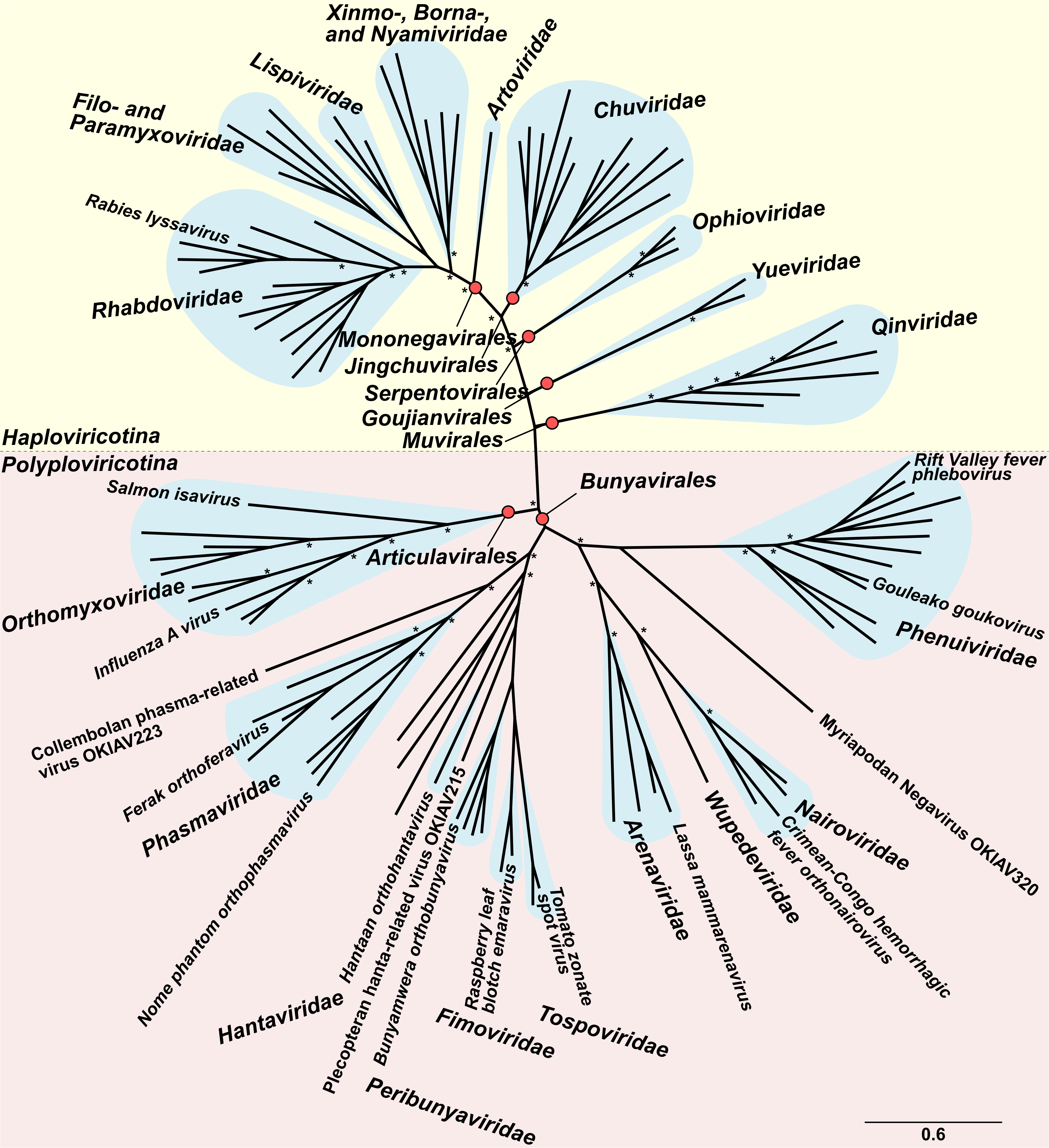
Phylogeny of −ssRNA viruses

Phylogenetic analysis based on RdRp shows that −ssRNA viruses are descended from a common ancestor and that they are likely a sister clade of reoviruses, which are dsRNA viruses. Within the phylum, there are two clear branches, assigned to two subphyla, based on whether RdRp synthesizes a cap on viral mRNA or snatches a cap from host mRNA and attaches that cap to viral mRNA.

Within the phylum, −ssRNA viruses that infect arthropods appear to be basal and the ancestors of all other −ssRNA viruses. Arthropods frequently live together in large groups, which allows for viruses to be transmitted easily. Over time, this has led to arthropod −ssRNA viruses gaining a high level of diversity. While arthropods host large quantities of viruses, there is disagreement about the degree to which cross-species transmission of arthropod −ssRNA viruses occurs among arthropods.

Plant and vertebrate −ssRNA viruses tend to be genetically related to arthropod-infected viruses. Furthermore, most −ssRNA viruses outside of arthropods are found in species that interact with arthropods. Arthropods therefore serve as both key hosts and vectors of transmission of −ssRNA viruses. In terms of transmission, non-arthropod −ssRNA viruses can be distinguished between those that are reliant on arthropods for transmission and those that can circulate among vertebrates without the aid of arthropods. The latter group is likely to have originated from the former, adapting to vertebrate-only transmission.

== Classification ==
Negarnaviricota belongs to the kingdom Orthornavirae, which encompasses all RNA viruses that encode RdRp, and the realm Riboviria, which includes Orthornavirae as well as all viruses that encode reverse transcriptase in the kingdom Pararnavirae. Negarnaviricota contains two subphyla, which contain a combined six classes, four of which are monotypic down to lower taxa:

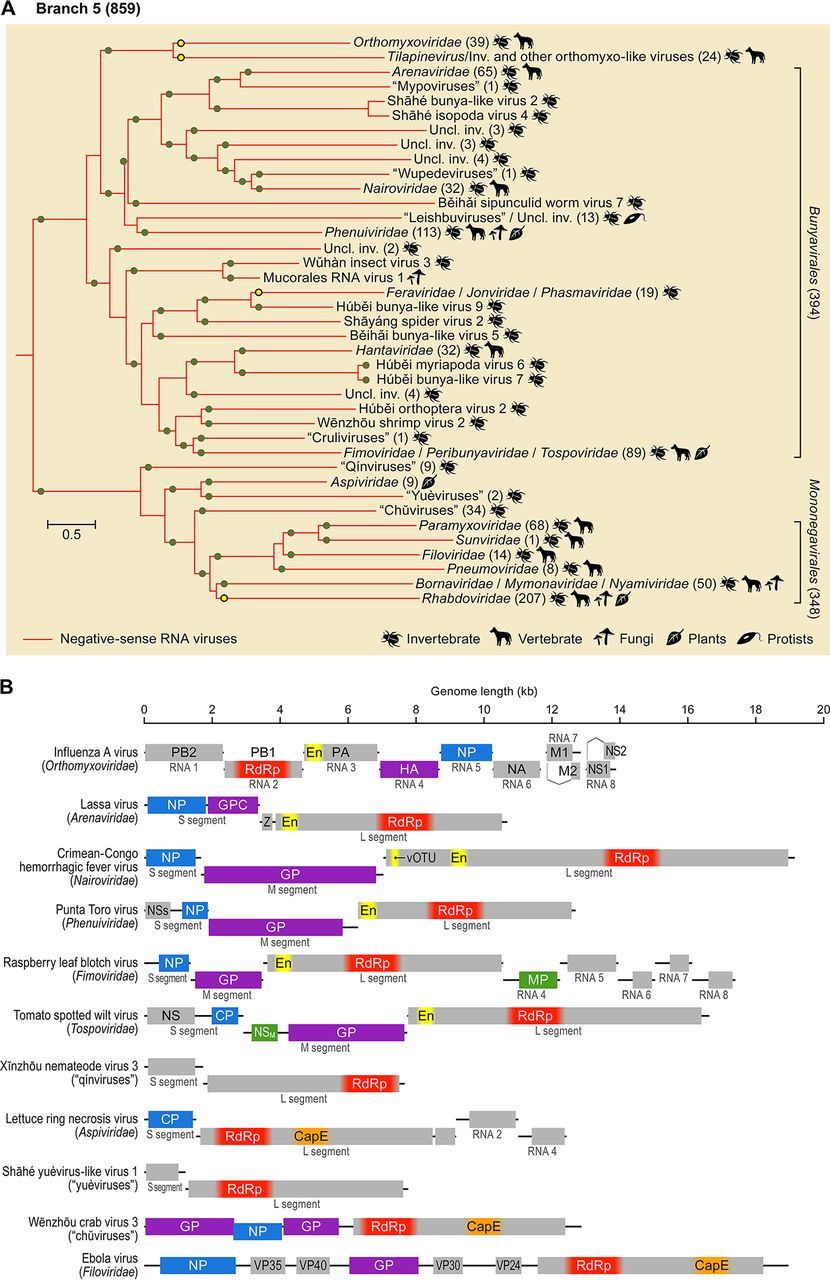
Phylogenetic tree of Negarnaviricota (top), genome of different members and major conserved proteins (bottom)

- Subphylum: Haploviricotina, which contains −ssRNA viruses that encode an RdRp that synthesizes a cap structure on viral mRNA and which usually have nonsegmented genomes
  - Class: Chunquiviricetes
    - Order: Muvirales
      - Family: Qinviridae
        - Genus: Yingvirus
  - Class: Milneviricetes
    - Order: Serpentovirales
      - Family: Aspviridae
        - Genus: Ophiovirus
  - Class: Monjiviricetes
  - Class: Yunchangviricetes
    - Order: Goujianvirales
      - Family: Yueviridae
        - Genus: Yuyuevirus
- Subphylum: Polyploviricotina, which contains −ssRNA viruses that encode an RdRp that takes a cap from host mRNA to use as the cap on viral mRNA and which have segmented genomes
  - Class: Bunyaviricetes
  - Class: Insthoviricetes
    - Order: Articulavirales

Negative-strand RNA viruses are classified as Group V in the Baltimore classification system, which groups viruses together based on their manner of mRNA production and which is often used alongside standard virus taxonomy, which is based on evolutionary history. Therefore, Group V and Negarnaviricota are synonymous.

== Disease ==
Negative-strand RNA viruses caused many widely known diseases. Many of these are transmitted by arthropods, including the Rift Valley fever virus and the tomato spotted wilt virus. Among vertebrates, bats and rodents are common vectors for many viruses, including the Ebola virus and the rabies virus, transmitted by bats and other vertebrates, and the Lassa fever virus and hantaviruses, transmitted by rodents. Influenza viruses are common among birds and mammals. Human-specific −ssRNA viruses include the measles virus and the mumps virus.

== History ==
Many diseases caused by −ssRNA viruses have been known throughout history, including hantavirus infection, measles, and rabies. In modern history, some such as Ebola and influenza have caused deadly disease outbreaks. The vesicular stomatitis virus, first isolated in 1925 and one of the first animal viruses to be studied because it could be studied well in cell cultures, was identified as an −ssRNA virus, which was unique at the time because other RNA viruses that had been discovered were positive sense. In the early 21st century, the bovine disease rinderpest, caused by −ssRNA rinderpest virus, became the second disease to be eradicated, after smallpox, caused by a DNA virus.

In the 21st century, viral metagenomics has become common to identify viruses in the environment. For −ssRNA viruses, this allowed for a large number of invertebrate, and especially arthropod, viruses to be identified, which helped to provide insight into the evolutionary history of −ssRNA viruses. Based on phylogenetic analysis of RdRp showing that −ssRNA viruses were descended from a common ancestor, Negarnaviricota and its two subphyla were established in 2018, and it was placed into the then newly established realm Riboviria.

== Gallery ==
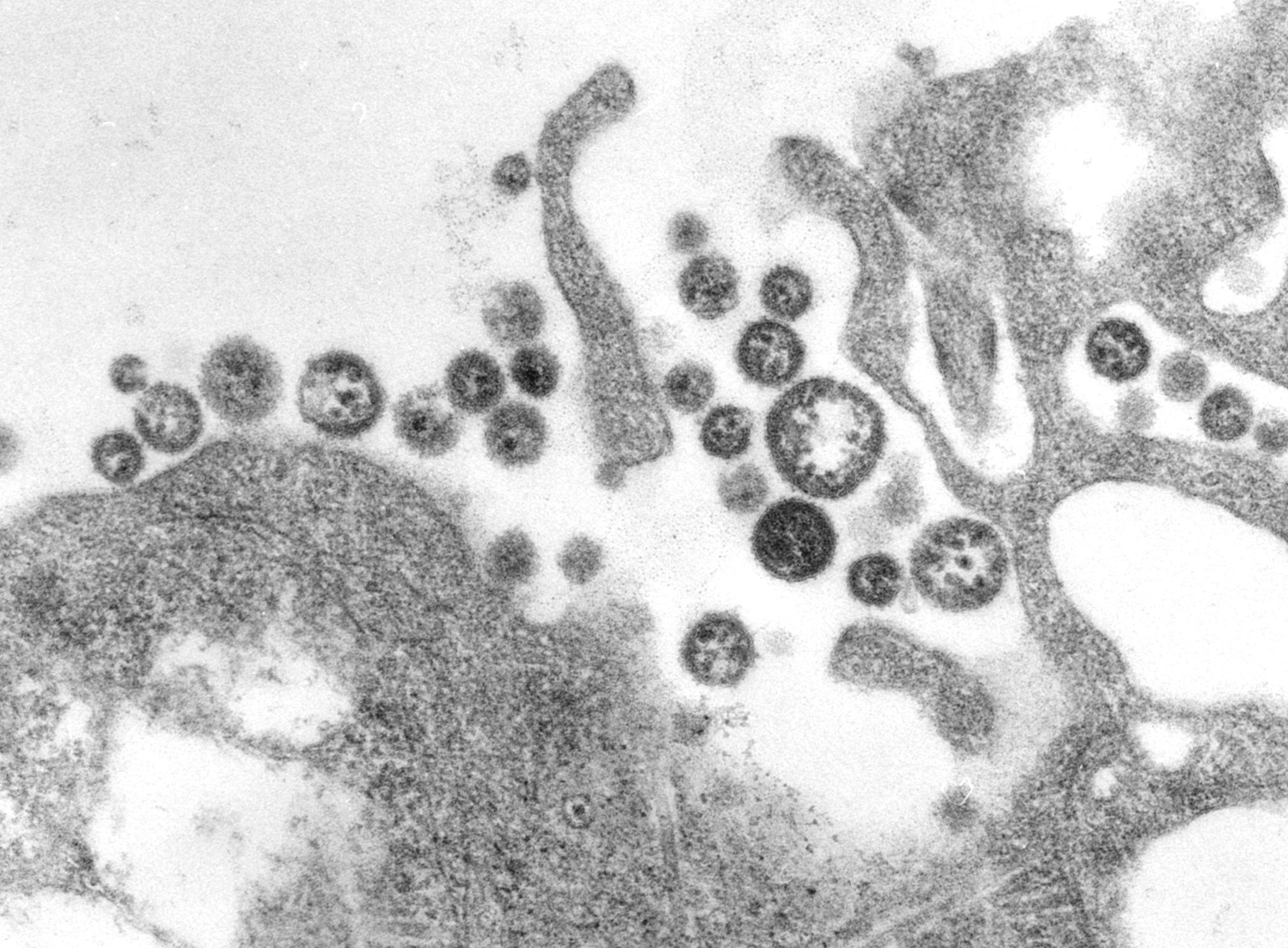
Lassa virus (Arenaviridae)

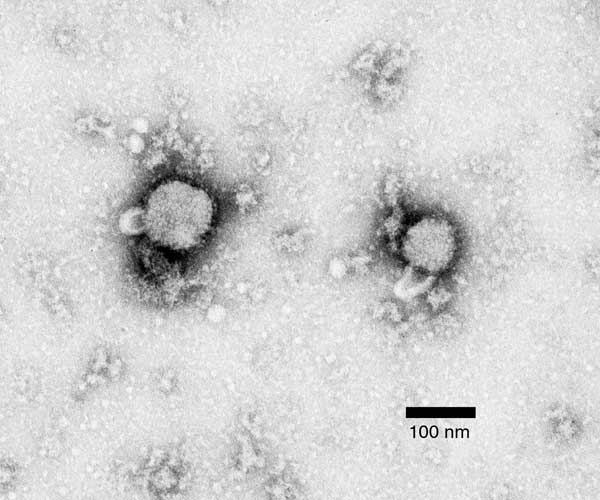
Lymphocytic choriomeningitis virus (Arenaviridae)

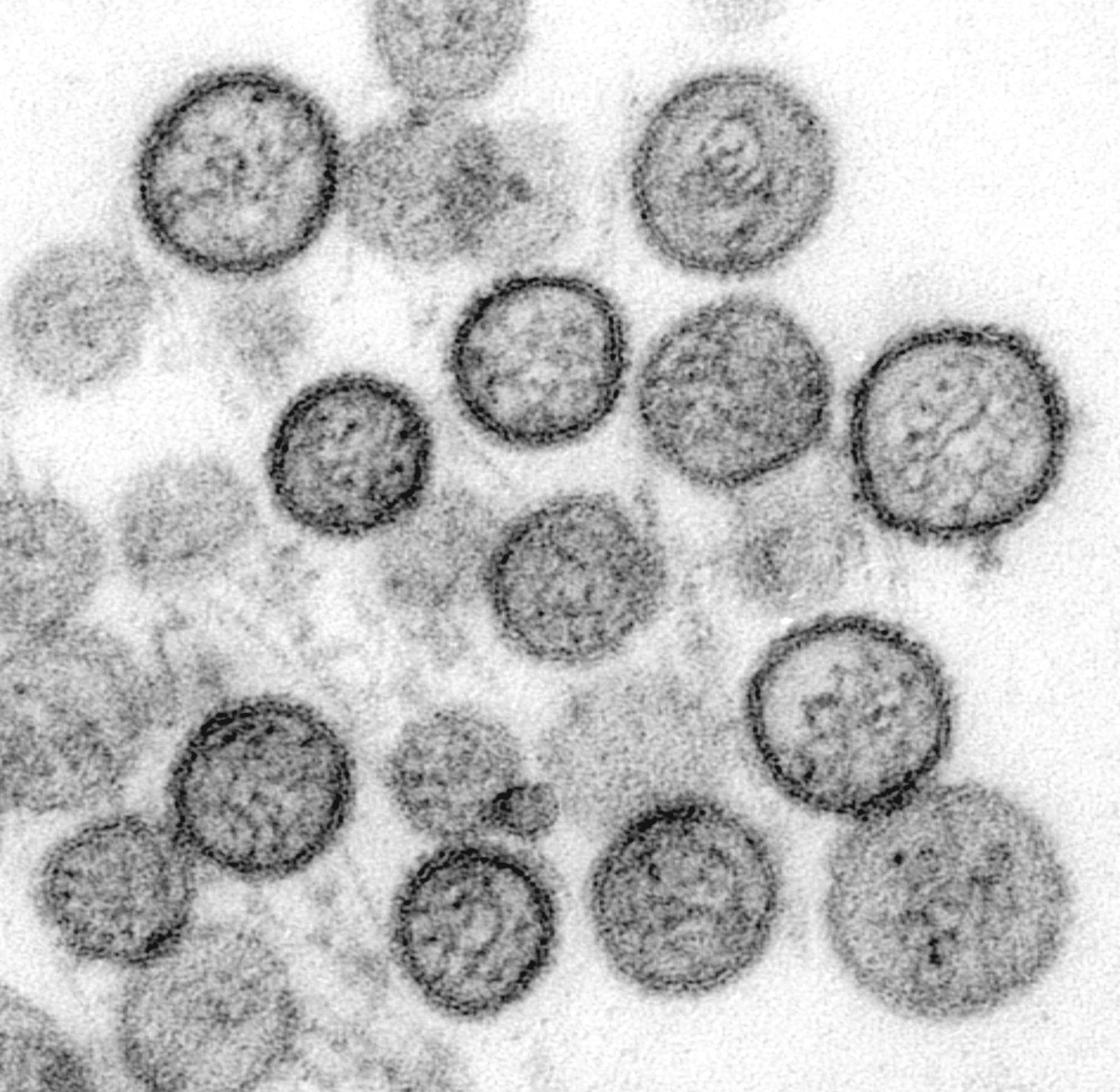
Hantavirus (Hantaviridae)

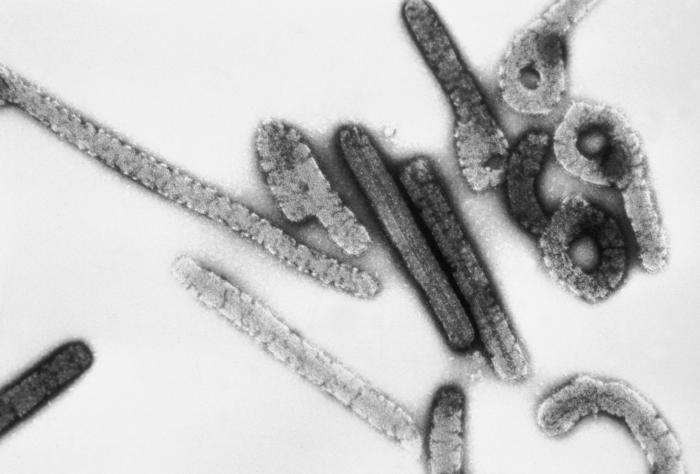
Marburg virus (Filoviridae)

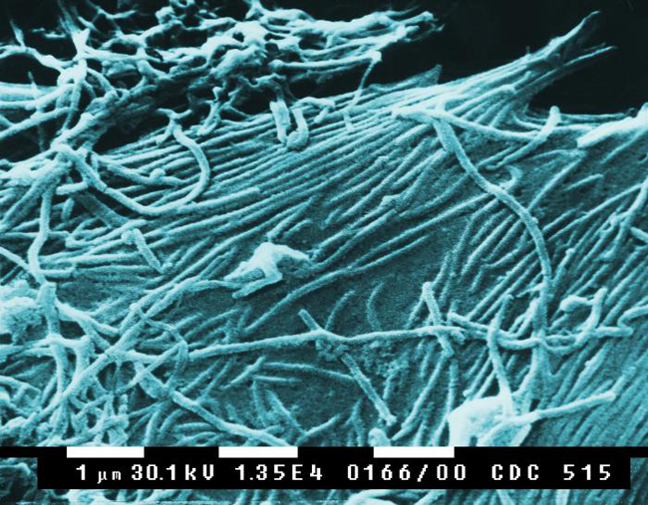
Ebola virus (Filoviridae)

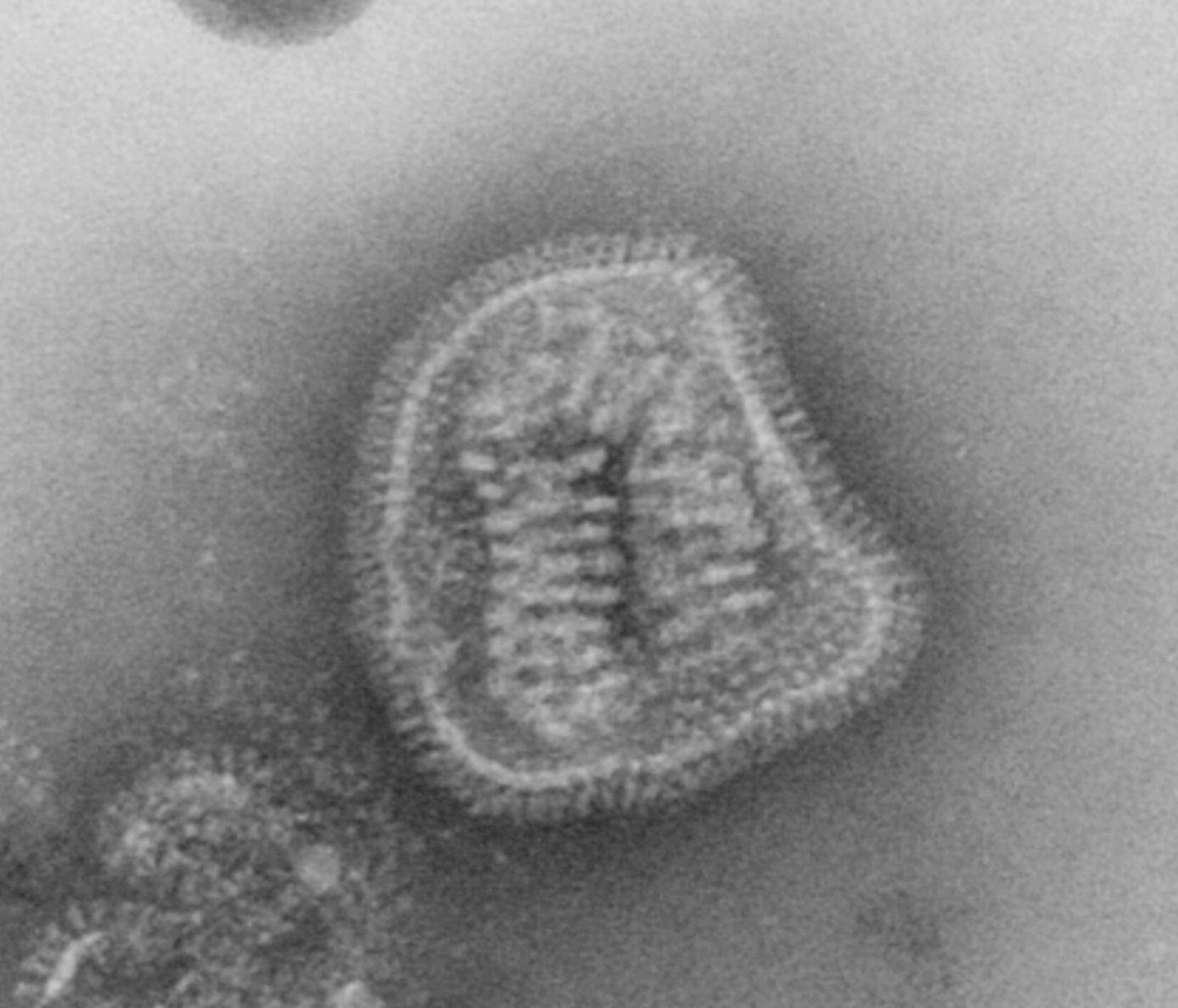
Influenza (Orthomyxoviridae)

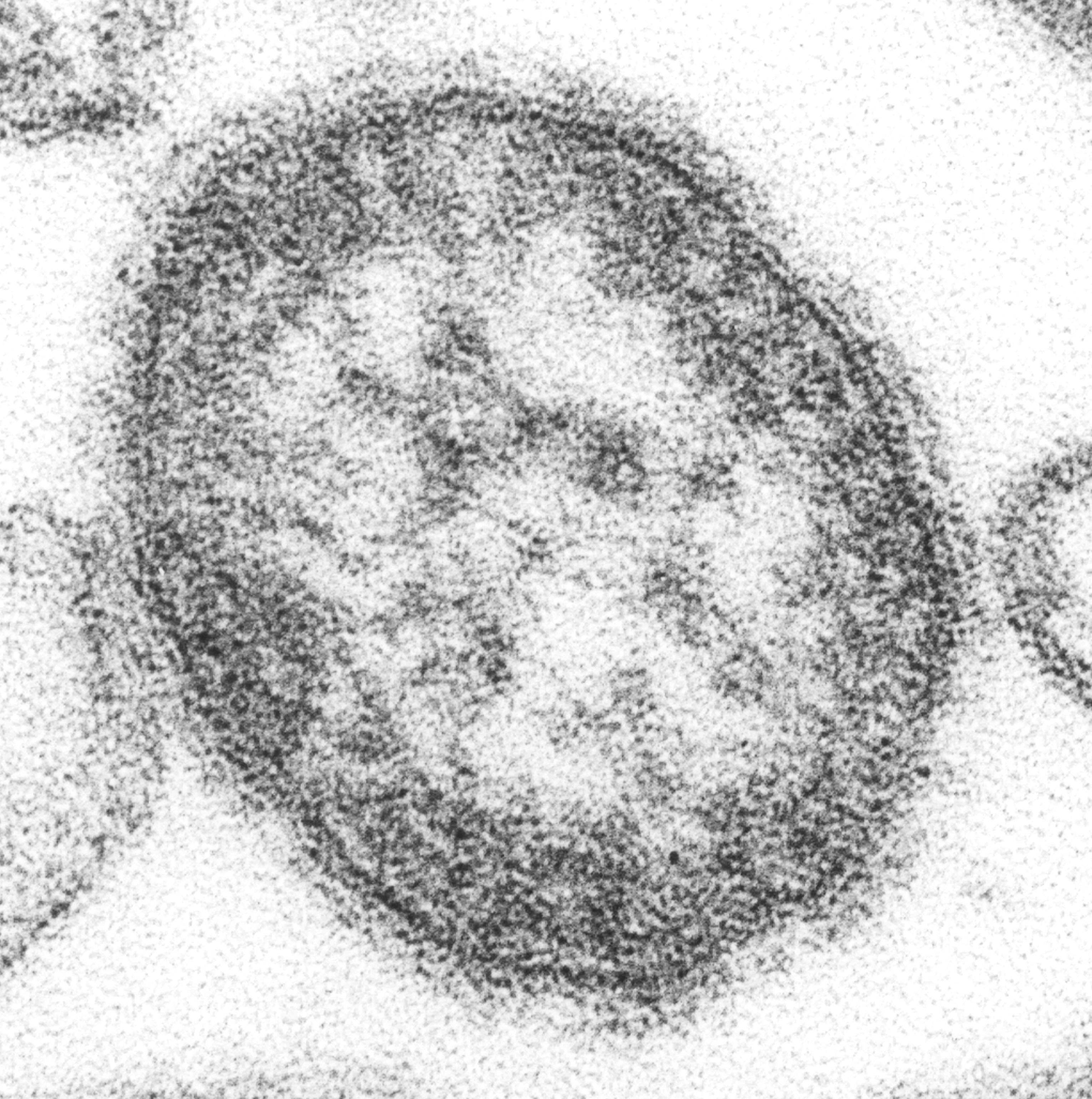
Measles (Paramyxoviridae)

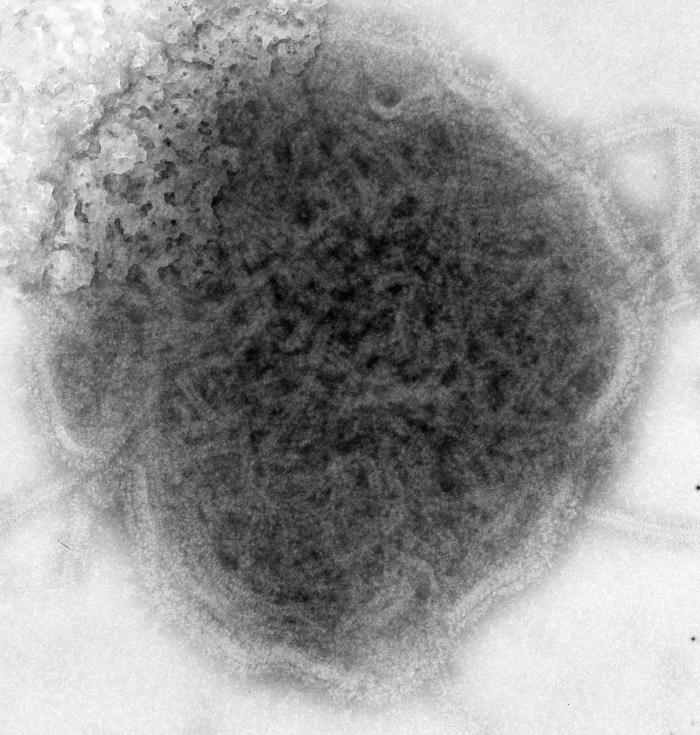
Mumps virus (Paramyxoviridae)

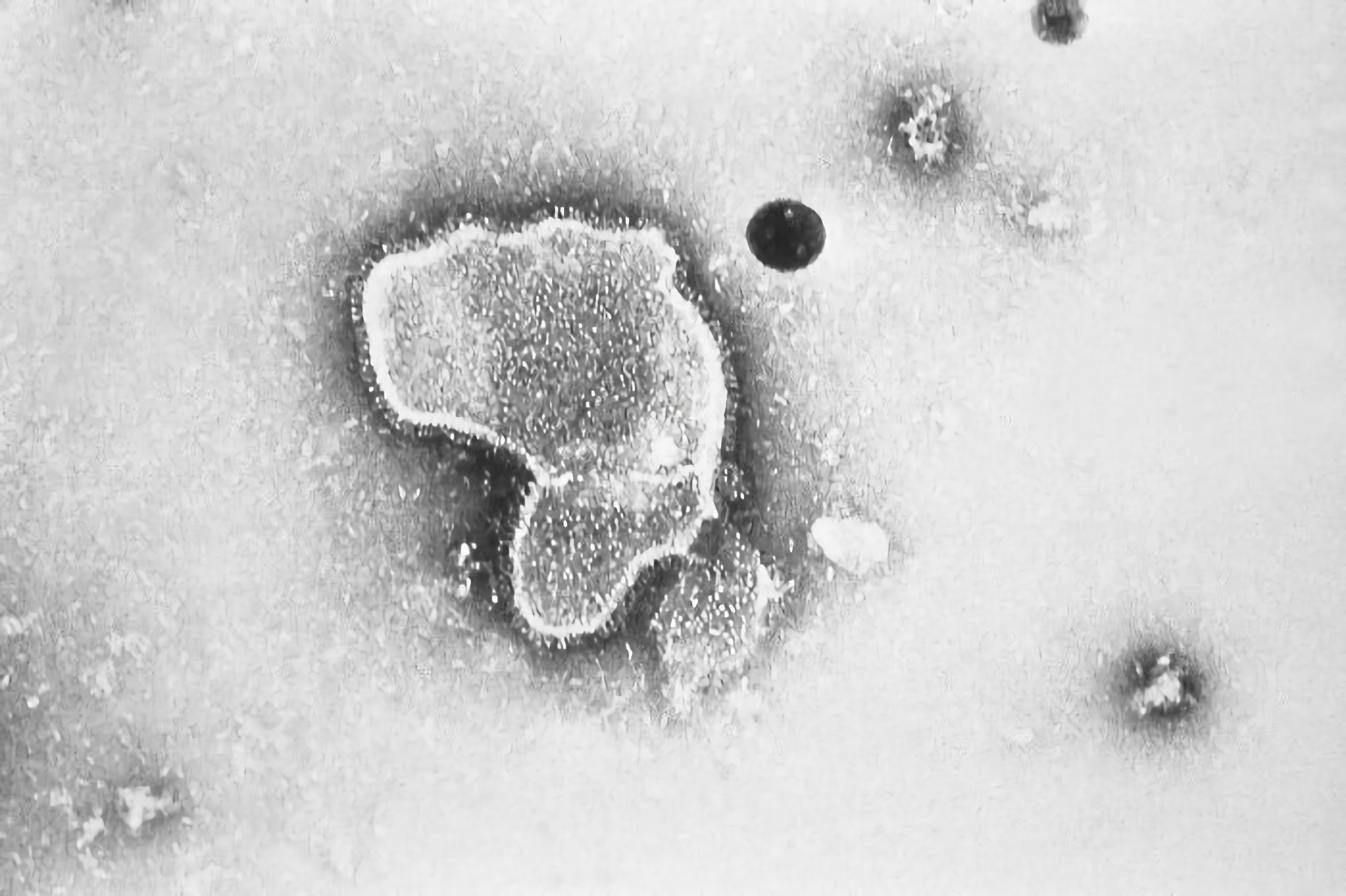
Human respiratory syncytial virus (Pneumoviridae)

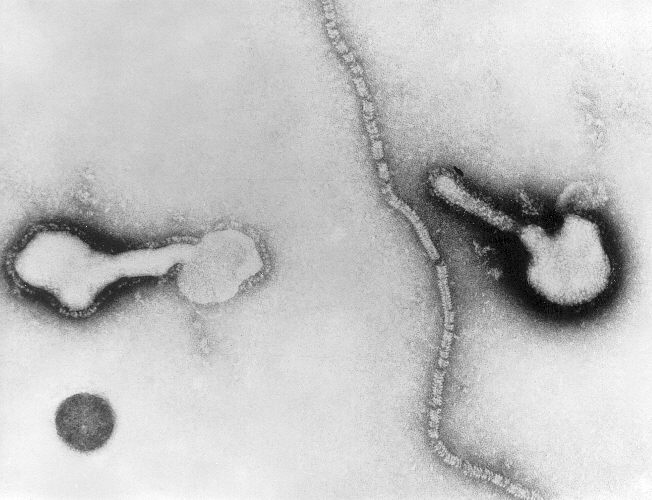
Parainfluenza (Paramyxoviridae)

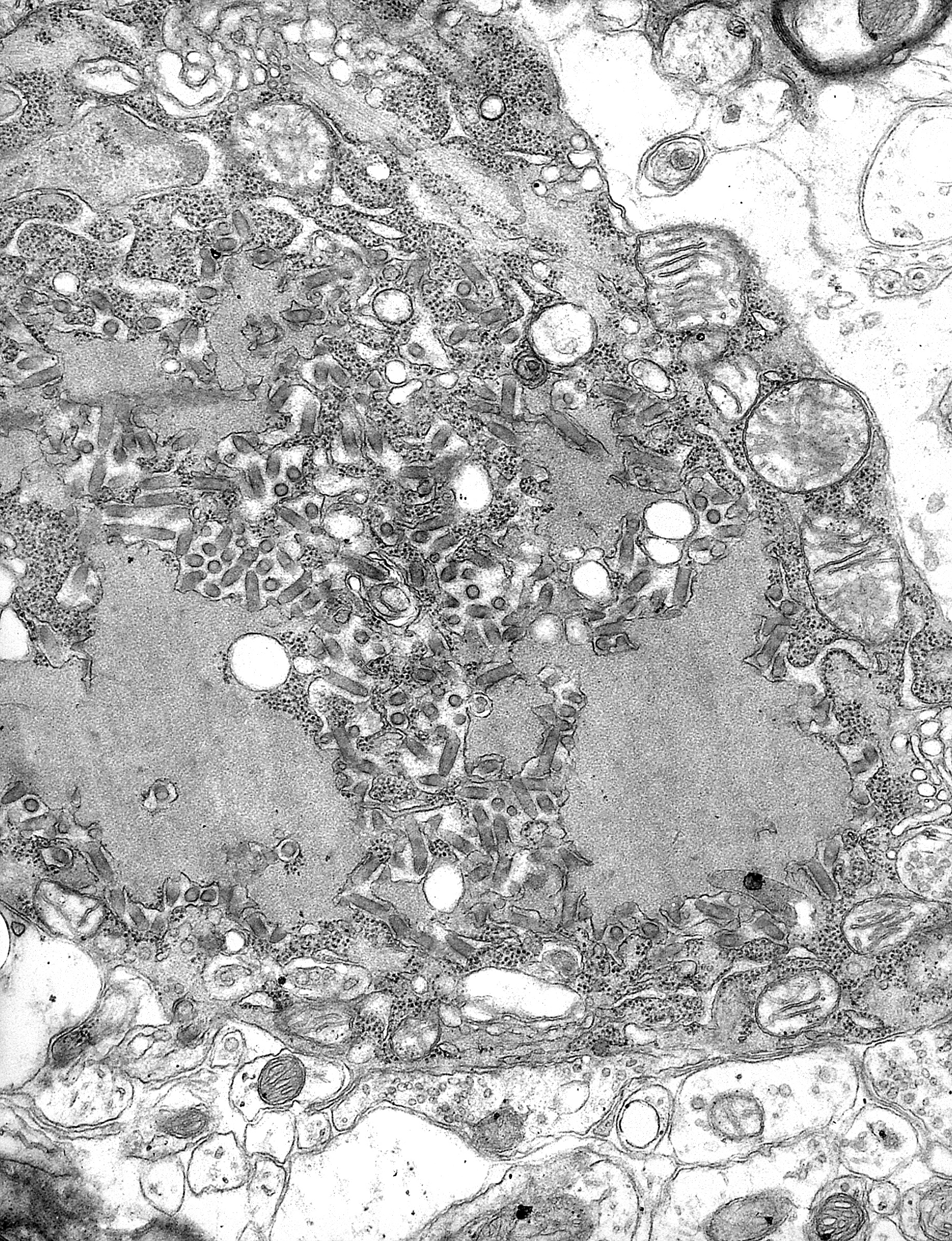
Rabies (Rhabdoviridae)

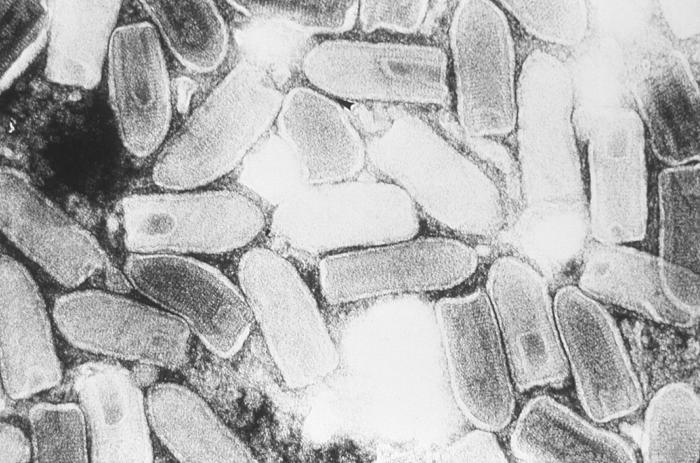
Vesicular stomatitis virus (Rhabdoviridae)

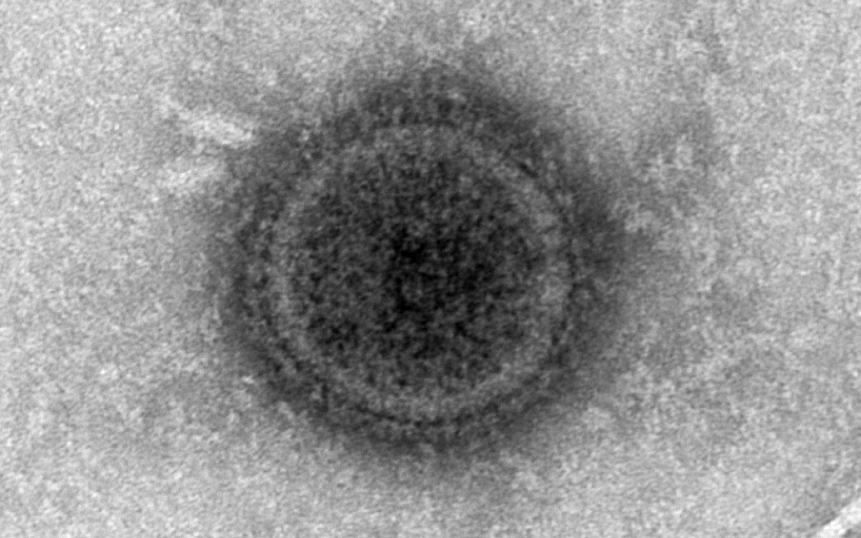
Nipah virus (Paramyxoviridae)
