= Chuviridae =

Virus classification
- (unranked): Virus
- Realm: Riboviria
- Kingdom: Orthornavirae
- Phylum: Negarnaviricota
- Class: Monjiviricetes
- Order: Jingchuvirales
- Family: Chuviridae

Family of viruses

Chuviridae is a family of negative-strand RNA viruses which infect arthropods including mosquitos.

== Taxonomy ==
The family contains the following genera:

- Boscovirus
- Chuvivirus
- Culicidavirus
- Demapteravirus
- Doliuvirus
- Mivirus
- Morsusvirus
- Nigecruvirus
- Odonatavirus
- Pediavirus
- Piscichuvirus
- Pterovirus
- Rochuvirus
- Scarabeuvirus
- Taceavirus
- Vapochuvirus
