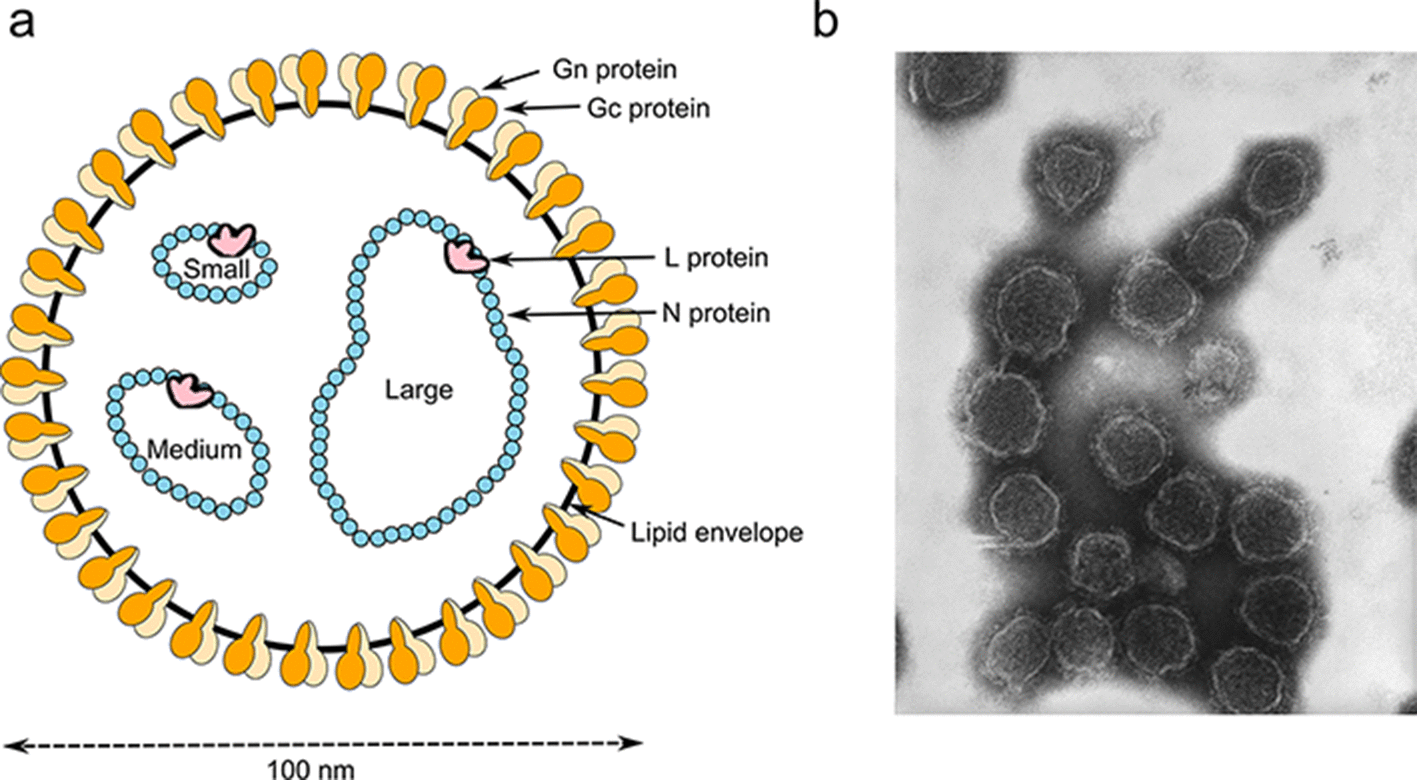
- Peribunyavirus structure (left); transmission electron micrograph of California encephalitis virus (right)

Virus classification
- (unranked): Virus
- Realm: Riboviria
- Kingdom: Orthornavirae
- Phylum: Negarnaviricota
- Subphylum: Polyploviricotina

Subtaxa
- See text

= Polyploviricotina =

Group of viruses

Polyploviricotina is a subphylum of viruses in the phylum Negarnaviricota. It is one of only two virus subphyla, the other being Haploviricotina, which is also in Negarnaviricota. The name comes from πολύπλοκο polyplo, the Ancient Greek for 'complex', along with the suffix for a virus subphylum; 'viricotina'.

== Taxonomy ==
The subphylum contains the following classes and orders (-viricetes denotes class and -virales denotes order):

- Bunyaviricetes
  - Elliovirales
  - Hareavirales
- Insthoviricetes
  - Articulavirales
