= Jingchuvirales =

Virus classification
- (unranked): Virus
- Realm: Riboviria
- Kingdom: Orthornavirae
- Phylum: Negarnaviricota
- Class: Monjiviricetes
- Order: Jingchuvirales

Order of viruses

Jingchuvirales is an order of viruses.

== Taxonomy ==
The order contains the following families:

- Aliusviridae
- Chuviridae
- Crepuscuviridae
- Myriaviridae
- Natareviridae
