= Yingvirus =

Virus classification
- (unranked): Virus
- Realm: Riboviria
- Kingdom: Orthornavirae
- Phylum: Negarnaviricota
- Class: Chunqiuviricetes
- Order: Muvirales
- Family: Qinviridae
- Genus: Yingvirus

Genus of viruses

Yingvirus is a genus of negative-strand RNA viruses which infect invertebrates. Member viruses have bisegmented genomes. It is the only genus in the family Qinviridae, which is the only family in Muvirales, which is the only order in Chunqiuviricetes. There are eight species in the genus.

== Etymology ==
The name Yingvirus derives from 嬴 (yíng), the ancestral name of Duke Mù of Qín during the Spring and Autumn period, along with -virus the suffix for a virus genus. Qinviridae gets its name from 秦 (Qín), meaning Qín State, added to -viridae the suffix for a virus family. Muvirales is from 穆 (Mù), again for Duke Mù of Qín, along with -virales the suffix for a virus order. Chunqiuviricetes is from 春秋时代 (Chūnqiū Shídài), or Spring and Autumn period, attached to -viricetes the suffix for a virus class.

== Genome ==
Yingviruses have linear, negative-sense, bisegmented RNA genomes. Genome lengths for four member species are:

- Yingvirus beihaiense: Beihai sesarmid crab virus 4 (7380 nt)
- Yingvirus hubeiense: Hubei qinvirus-like virus 1 (7366 nt)
- Yingvirus sanxiaense: Sanxia Qinvirus-like virus 1 (8238 nt)
- Yingvirus wenzhouense: Wenzhou qinvirus-like virus 2 (8052 nt)

== Taxonomy ==
The genus contains the following species:

- Yingvirus beihaiense
- Yingvirus charybdis
- Yingvirus hubeiense
- Yingvirus sanxiaense
- Yingvirus shaheense
- Yingvirus wenzhouense
- Yingvirus wuhanense
- Yingvirus xinzhouense
