= Yuyuevirus =

Virus classification
- (unranked): Virus
- Realm: Riboviria
- Kingdom: Orthornavirae
- Phylum: Negarnaviricota
- Class: Yunchangviricetes
- Order: Goujianvirales
- Family: Yueviridae
- Genus: Yuyuevirus

Genus of viruses

Yuyuevirus is a genus of negative-strand RNA viruses which infect invertebrates. Member viruses have bisegmented genomes. It is the only genus in the family Yueviridae, which in turn is the only family in the order Goujianvirales and class Yunchangviricetes. The genus contains two species.

== Etymology ==
The name Yuyuevirus is from 於越 (Yúyuè), a synonym for the Spring and Autumn period state of Yuè, along with -virus, the suffix for a virus genus. Yueviridae comes from 越 (Yuè), also referring to Yuè state, with the suffix for virus family -viridae. Goujianvirales is named in honor of Goujian (Gōujiàn 勾踐) the king of Yuè State. Yunchangviricetes is named in honor of Yǔncháng (Yǔncháng 允常), the father of Gōujiàn.

== Genome ==
Yuyueviruses have negative-sense, single-stranded RNA genomes that are bisegemented. The total genome length is 7.8–8.2 kbp.

== Taxonomy ==
The genus contains the following species:

- Yuyuevirus beihaiense
- Yuyuevirus shaheense
