= 2025–26 Ethiopian Marburg virus disease outbreak =

Disease outbreak in Ethiopia

- Disease: Marburg virus disease
- Location: Ethiopia
- First outbreak: Jinka, South Ethiopia Regional State
- Date: 12 November 2025 – 26 January 2026
- Type: Viral hemorrhagic fever
- Confirmed cases: 14
- Recovered: 5
- Deaths: 9
- Fatality rate: 64%

On 12 November 2025, the Ethiopian Ministry of Health and the Ethiopian Public Health Institute (EPHI) announced a viral hemorrhagic fever (VHF), later confirmed as Marburg virus disease originated from Jinka town in southern Ethiopia.

On 26 January 2026, the Ethiopian government announced the end of the virus outbreak following enhanced control measures and found no suspected case within 42 days.

== Timeline of outbreak ==
On 12 November 2025, WHO issued a press release from Ethiopian Ministry of Health (MoH), and the Ethiopian Public Health Institute (EPHI) reporting viral hemorrhagic fever (VHF) cases in Jinka town, South Ethiopia Regional State. On 14 November 2025, the Ministry of Health confirmed the VHF was Marburg virus.

Through 20 November 2025, 33 specimens had been tested; six were laboratory-confirmed Marburg virus disease (MVD), including three deaths. In addition to the laboratory-confirmed cases, three epidemiologically-linked suspected cases could not be tested.

On 4 December 2025, the US Administration for Strategic Preparedness and Response announced it would provide 2,500 doses of an investigational vaccine and 25 doses of an experimental monoclonal antibody therapy for treatment to the Ethiopian government.

Through 22 December 2025, there were 14 MVD cases reported, which included nine deaths and five recoveries.

On 26 January 2026, the Ethiopian government declared the end of virus outbreak after intensive surveillance and mandatory control measures. A total of 14 confirmed cases, including nine deaths, were reported during the outbreak.

== See also ==
- Rwanda Marburg virus disease outbreak
- 2023 Equatorial Guinea Marburg virus disease outbreak
- 2023 Tanzania Marburg virus disease outbreak
