= Lloviu virus =

Lloviu cuevavirus

Virus classification
- (unranked): Virus
- Realm: Riboviria
- Kingdom: Orthornavirae
- Phylum: Negarnaviricota
- Class: Monjiviricetes
- Order: Mononegavirales
- Family: Filoviridae
- Genus: Cuevavirus
- Species: Lloviu cuevavirus

Member virus
- Lloviu virus (LLOV)

Species of virus

The species Lloviu cuevavirus (/ˈjɒvjuː ˌkwɛvəˈvaɪrəs/ YOV-ew KWEV-ə-VY-rəs) is the taxonomic home of a virus that forms filamentous virion, Lloviu virus (LLOV). The species is included in the genus Cuevavirus. LLOV is a distant relative of the commonly known Ebola virus and Marburg virus.

== Use of term ==
The species Lloviu cuevavirus is a virological taxon (i.e. a man-made concept) included in the genus Cuevavirus, family Filoviridae, order Mononegavirales. The species has a single virus member, Lloviu virus. Lloviu virus is the sole member of the species Lloviu cuevavirus, which is included genus Cuevavirus, family Filoviridae, order Mononegavirales. The name Lloviu virus is derived from Cueva del Lloviu (the name of a Spanish cave in which it was first discovered) and the taxonomic suffix virus (which denotes a virus species).

In 2010, the species and the genus cuevavirus were proposed as independent species and genus. In July 2013, the species and the genus cuevavirus were ratified by the International Committee on Taxonomy of Viruses (ICTV) to be included in its report, therefore the name is now to be italicized.

== Species inclusion criteria ==
A virus that fulfills the criteria for being a member of the genus "Cuevavirus" is a member of the species "Lloviu cuevavirus" if it has the properties of "cuevaviruses" (because there is currently only "cuevavirus" species) and if its genome differs from that of Lloviu virus (variant Bat86) by <30% at the nucleotide level.

Lloviu virus (/ˈjɒvjuː/ YOV-yoo; LLOV) is a virus distantly related to the well-known pathogens Ebola virus and Marburg virus.

== History ==
LLOV was discovered in 2011 in Schreibers's long-fingered bats (species Miniopterus schreibersii) that were found dead in Cueva del Lloviu in 2002, Asturias, Spain, as well as in caves in Spanish Cantabria and in caves in France and Portugal. It has not yet been proven that the virus is the etiological agent of a novel bat disease, but healthy Schreibers' long-fingered bats were not found to contain traces of the viruses, thereby at least suggesting that the virus may be pathogenic for certain bats. Necropsies of dead bats did not reveal macroscopic pathology, but microscopic examination suggested viral pneumonia. No information is available about whether or not LLOV infects humans.

Seroreactivity of additional Schreibers's long-fingered bats were reported from North Spain from 2015, suggesting the circulation of the virus among those bat colonies. However PCR positive animals were not found.

Additional Schreibers's long-fingered bat die-off events were reported from Hungary in 2013, 2016 and 2017. The presence of LLOV was confirmed in bat carcasses from 2016, presenting hemorrhagic symptoms. Updated genome data was obtained from the Hungarian samples in 2020, using the Nanopore sequencing technique. The infectious virus was isolated from Schreibers's long-fingered bat in Hungary, making it only the third filovirus along with Marburg and Ravn viruses ever isolated from bats.

== Virology ==
=== Genome ===
Although LLOV was isolated in tissue culture, yet its genome has been determined in its entirety with exception of the 3' and 5' UTRs. Like all mononegaviruses, LLOV virions contain a non-infectious, linear nonsegmented, single-stranded RNA genome of negative polarity that most likely possesses inverse-complementary 3' and 5' termini, does not possess a 5' cap, is not polyadenylated, and is not covalently linked to a protein. The LLOV genome is probably approximately 19 kb long and contains seven genes in the order 3'-UTR-NP-VP35-VP40-GP-VP30-VP24-L-5'-UTR. In contrast to ebolaviruses and Marburgviruses, which synthesize seven mRNAs to express the seven structural proteins, LLOV seems to produce only six mRNAs, i.e. one mRNA (VP24/L) is thought to be bicistronic. LLOV genomic transcriptional termination sites are identical to those of ebolavirus genomes but different from those of Marburgvirus genomes. LLOV transcriptional initiation sites are unique.

=== Replication ===
The LLOV life cycle is hypothesized to begin with virion attachment to specific cell-surface receptors, followed by internalization, fusion of the virion envelope with endosomal membranes and the concomitant release of the virus nucleocapsid into the cytosol. LLOV glycoprotein (GP) is cleaved by endosomal cysteine proteases (cathepsins) and the cleaved glycoprotein interacts with the intracellular entry receptor, Niemann-Pick C1 (NPC1). The virus RdRp would partially uncoat the nucleocapsid and transcribe the genes into positive-stranded mRNAs, which would then be translated into structural and nonstructural proteins. LLOV L would bind to a single promoter located at the 3' end of the genome. Transcription would either terminate after a gene or continue to the next gene downstream. This means that genes close to the 3' end of the genome would be transcribed in the greatest abundance, whereas those toward the 5' end would be least likely to be transcribed. The gene order would therefore be a simple but effective form of transcriptional regulation. The most abundant protein produced would be the nucleoprotein, whose concentration in the cell would determine when L switches from gene transcription to genome replication. Replication would result in full-length, positive-stranded antigenomes that would in turn be transcribed into negative-stranded virus progeny genome copies. Newly synthesized structural proteins and genomes would self-assemble and accumulate near the inside of the cell membrane. Virions would bud off from the cell, gaining their envelopes from the cellular membrane they bud from. The mature progeny particles would then infect other cells to repeat the cycle.
