= Mengla dianlovirus =

Virus classification
- (unranked): Virus
- Realm: Riboviria
- Kingdom: Orthornavirae
- Phylum: Negarnaviricota
- Class: Monjiviricetes
- Order: Mononegavirales
- Family: Filoviridae
- Genus: Dianlovirus
- Species: Mengla dianlovirus

Synonyms
- Mengla virus

Species of virus

Mengla dianlovirus (MLAV, also written Měnglà virus) is a type of filovirus identified in a Rousettus bat in Mengla County, Yunnan Province, China, and was first reported in January 2019. It is classified in the same family as Ebolavirus and Marburgvirus.

It is the only member of the genus Dianlovirus. The name derives from 滇 (diān), the Chinese language abbreviation for Yunnan, added to "filovirus", the common name for Filoviridae. Neither the species nor the genus are listed in the 2018 ICTV classification, as the virus was formally described after that report was released. A formal proposal was submitted for the taxa in January 2019.

MLAV proteins, including VP35 and VP40, inhibit host immune responses by interfering with interferon signaling, contributing to immune evasion similar to other filoviruses. Like other filoviruses, Mengla virus utilizes the Niemann-Pick C1 (NPC1) receptor for cell entry, a trait that may facilitate cross-species transmission.
