= 2024 Rwanda Marburg virus disease outbreak =

2024 disease outbreak in Rwanda

Rwanda marburg disease outbreak
- Initial case: 28 September 2024
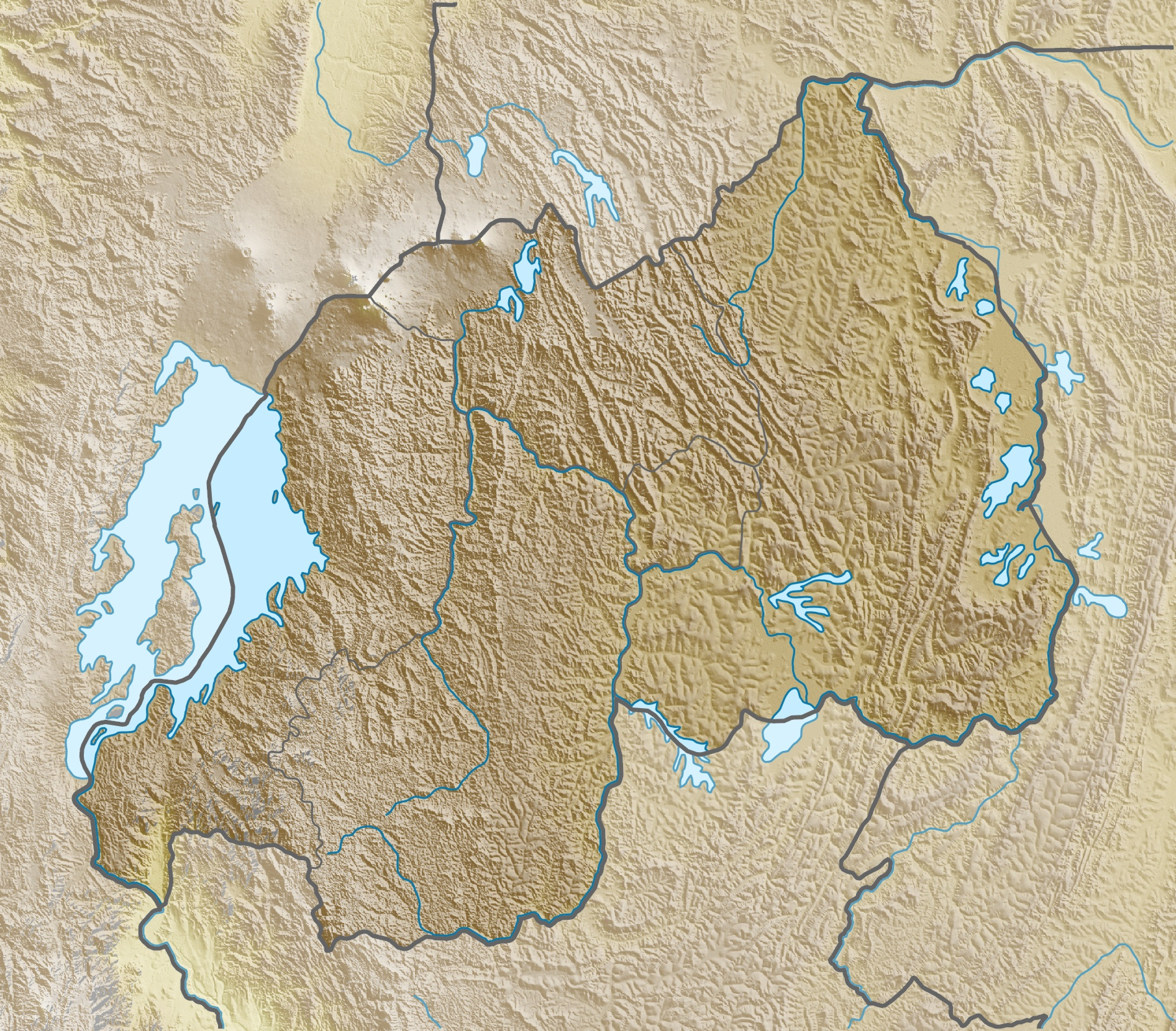
- Map of Rwanda
- Confirmed cases: 65
- Deaths: 15

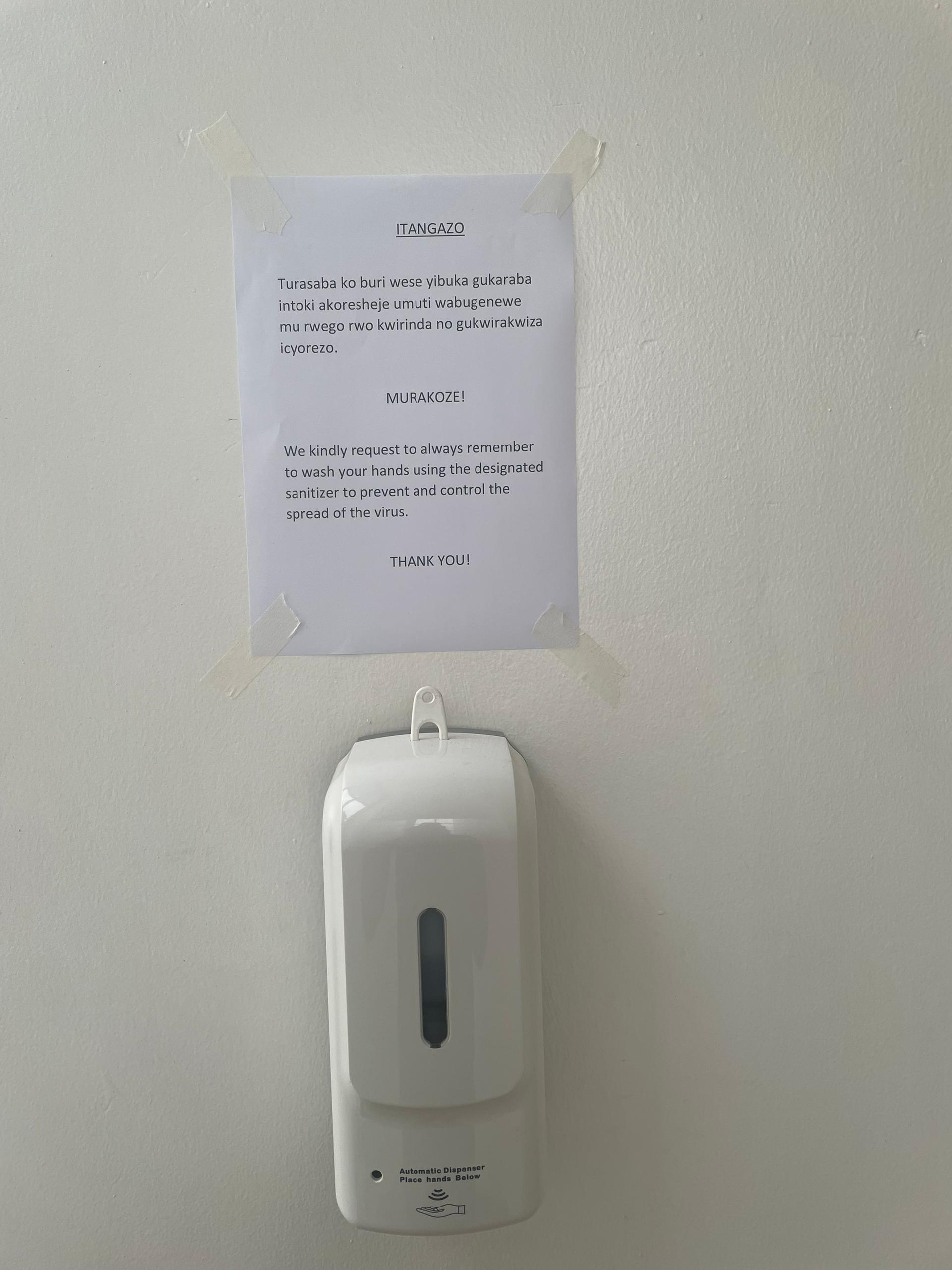
Notice in place to prevent the spread of Marburg virus in Rwanda, Kigali

The first-ever outbreak of Marburg virus disease (MVD) in Rwanda was reported to the World Health Organization (WHO) on 28 September 2024. The outbreak is one of the biggest Marburg outbreaks ever documented. Most cases were in healthcare workers, especially those working in intensive care units. Cases have been reported in seven of the 30 districts with three districts in the City of Kigali reporting the highest number. As of 10 October 2024, there were 58 confirmed cases and 13 fatalities. The outbreak was declared over by the WHO and the Rwandan government on 20 December 2024 after no new cases were reported in the preceding 42 days.

== Background ==
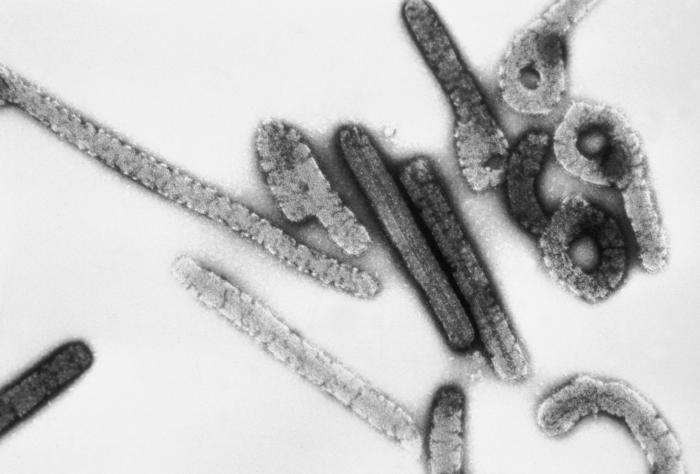
Transmission electron micrograph of Marburg virus

Marburg virus disease is a viral hemorrhagic fever which affects people and primates. The disease can cause serious illness or death. The virus was first discovered in 1967 after outbreaks in Marburg and Frankfurt, Germany, which had been linked to lab work involving African green monkeys from Uganda. Since then outbreaks have been recorded in Uganda, Guinea, Ghana, Equatorial Guinea, and Tanzania.

Marburg virus can be transmitted to humans from fruit bats, and spreads through human-to-human contact, typically via bodily fluids and contaminated medical equipment.

The fatality rate of Marburg virus disease is around 50 percent, but it can vary from 24 to 88 percent depending on several factors.

In contrast to Ebola which has an Ebola vaccine, there is no treatment or vaccine for MVD. This is due to the economics of vaccines, and the fact that until the mid-2010s, there were few fatalities from filovirusses. There are a number of candidate vaccines against Marburg virus disease. Legal monopolies are hindering production and testing of candidate vaccines.

== Epidemiology ==
The index case for the outbreak is believed to be a 27-year-old man who was being treated at King Faisal Hospital in Kigali after being exposed to the virus from contact with bats.

On 28 September 2024, the World Health Organization was informed of a first ever Marburg virus disease outbreak in Rwanda. On that day, there were already 26 known cases, mostly in healthcare workers, eight of which had been fatal.

As of 3 October 2024, there were 36 confirmed cases, at least 19 of whom were healthcare workers, most of them working in intensive care units, and 11 people reportedly died of the infection,

On 6 October 2024, there were 49 confirmed cases and 12 deaths, and on October 7, 56 cases out of 2387 tests carried out. As of 10 October 2024, there were 58 confirmed cases and 13 dead.

On 20 October, authorities said that there was no community transmission of disease after no new cases were recorded in the preceding six days.

As of 30 October 2024, Rwanda has recorded 66 illnesses and 15 deaths from Marburg while 75 percent of patients with Marburg had recovered.

On 8 November 2024, the last patient to be treated for Marburg was released from hospital. On 20 December 2024, the WHO and the Rwandan government declared an end to the outbreak after no new cases were reported in the preceding 42 days.

== Geography ==
As of October 3, cases had been reported in seven of the 30 districts in Rwanda. Three districts in the City of Kigali reported the highest number of cases, namely Gasabo District, Kicukiro District and Nyarugenge District. Other districts included Nyagatare District and Gatsibo District in the Northeast, which border Tanzania, site of the 2023 Tanzania Marburg virus disease outbreak as well as Rubavu District in the Northwest bordering Democratic Republic of the Congo and Kamonyi District, which is adjacent to Kigali in the center.

== Responses ==
The U.S. embassy in Rwanda issued an alert on the matter on 29 September 2024 and advised staff to work remotely. Contact tracing was started, and as of 3 October, 3,000 people were being monitored because they came in contact with the infected individuals.

The WHO advised against travel and for trade restrictions with Rwanda. The Centers for Disease Control issued a travel alert, which was criticised as "unnecessary" and made without input from local authorities by Africa Centres for Disease Control and Prevention director-general Jean Kaseya, citing the Rwandan government's rapid response to the outbreak.

Gilead Sciences donated 5,000 vials of remdesivir as emergency treatment.

On 6 October 2024, Rwandan health minister Sabin Nsanzimana confirmed that the country had received about 700 vaccine doses to be used in trial, which will be distributed on a priority basis starting with healthcare workers, the frontline response team and individuals who were in contact with the confirmed cases. These trial vaccines were delivered by the Sabin Vaccine Institute as a support by the government of US and international partners. As of 14 October, more than 200 people have been vaccinated.

On 31 October 2024, the Sabin Vaccine Institute dispatched 1,000 additional investigational vaccine doses for a randomized clinical trial arm within an ongoing open-label study. As of end of October, more than 1,500 frontline workers had been vaccinated in Rwanda with the Sabin vaccine.

== See also ==
- List of other Filoviridae outbreaks
