= Marburg vaccine =

Vaccine against Marburg virus disease

A Marburg vaccine would protect against Marburg virus disease (MVD). There are currently no Food and Drug Administration-approved vaccines for the prevention of MVD. Many candidate vaccines have been developed and tested in various animal models. There is not yet an approved vaccine, because of economic factors in vaccine development, and because filoviruses killed few before the 2010s.

The most promising candidate vaccines are DNA vaccines or based on Venezuelan equine encephalitis virus replicons, vesicular stomatitis Indiana virus (VSIV) or filovirus-like particles (VLPs) as all of these candidates could protect nonhuman primates from marburgvirus-induced disease. DNA vaccines have entered clinical trials.

== History ==
The first clinical study testing the efficacy of a Marburg virus vaccine was conducted in 2014. The study tested a DNA vaccine and concluded that individuals inoculated with the vaccine exhibited some level of antibodies. However, these vaccines were not expected to provide definitive immunity. Several animal models have shown to be effective in the research of Marburg virus, such as hamsters, mice, and non-human primates (NHPs). Mice are useful in the initial phases of vaccine development as they are ample models for mammalian disease, but their immune systems are still different enough from humans to warrant trials with other mammals. Of these models, the infection in macaques seems to be the most similar to the effects in humans. A variety of other vaccines have been considered. Virus replicon particles (VRPs) were shown to be effective in guinea pigs, but lost efficacy once tested on NHPs. Additionally, an inactivated virus vaccine proved ineffective. DNA vaccines showed some efficacy in NHPs, but all inoculated individuals showed signs of infection.

Because Marburg virus and Ebola virus belong to the same family, Filoviridae, some scientists have attempted to create a single-injection vaccine for both viruses. This would both make the vaccine more practical and lower the cost for developing countries. Using a single-injection vaccine has shown to not cause any adverse reactogenicity, which the possible immune response to vaccination, in comparison to two separate vaccinations.

There is a candidate vaccine against the Marburg virus called rVSV-MARV. It was developed alongside vaccines for closely-related Ebolaviruses by the Canadian government in the early 2000s, twenty years before the outbreak. Production and testing of rVSV-MARV is blocked by legal monopolies held by the Merck Group. Merck acquired rights to all the closely related candidate vaccines in 2014, but declined to work on most of them, including the Marburg vaccine, for economic reasons. While Merck returned the rights to the abandoned vaccines to the Public Health Agency of Canada, the vital rVSV vaccine production techniques which Merck had gained (while bringing the closely related rVSV-ZEBOV vaccine into commercial use in 2019, with GAVI funding) remain Merck's, and cannot be used by anyone else wishing to develop a rVSV vaccine.

As of June 23, 2022, researchers working with the Public Health Agency of Canada conducted a study which showed promising results of a recombinant vesicular stomatitis virus (rVSV) vaccine in guinea pigs, entitled PHV01. According to the study, inoculation with the vaccine approximately one month prior to infection with the virus provided a high level of protection.

Even though there is much experimental research on Marburg virus, there is still no prominent vaccine. Human vaccination trials are either ultimately unsuccessful or are missing data specifically regarding Marburg virus. Due to the cost needed to handle Marburg virus at qualified facilities, the relatively few number of fatalities, and lack of commercial interest, the possibility of a vaccine has simply not come to fruition (see also economics of vaccines).

== See also ==
- Rwanda Marburg virus disease outbreak
