= Gligić =

Gligić or Gligic is a surname. Notable people with the surname include:

- Ana Gligić (1934–2025), Yugoslav and Serbian virologist
- Michael Gligic (born 1989), Canadian golfer
