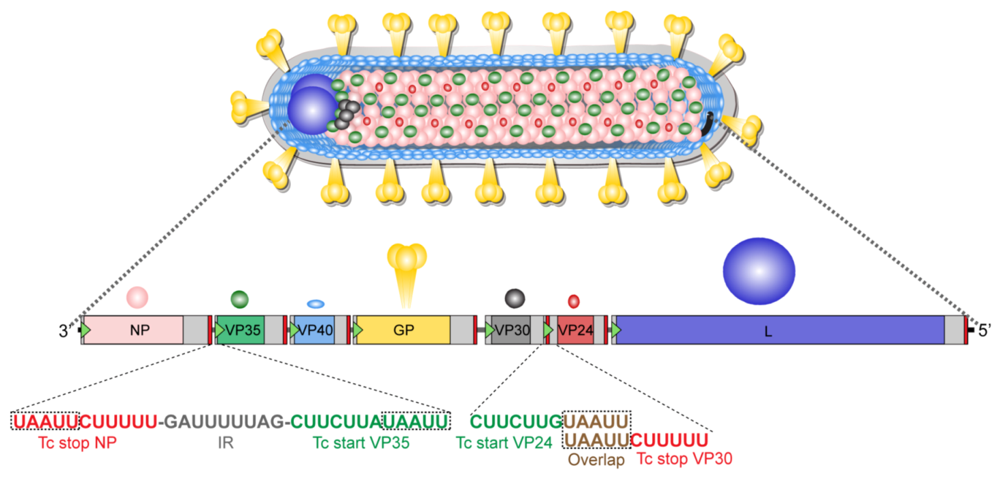

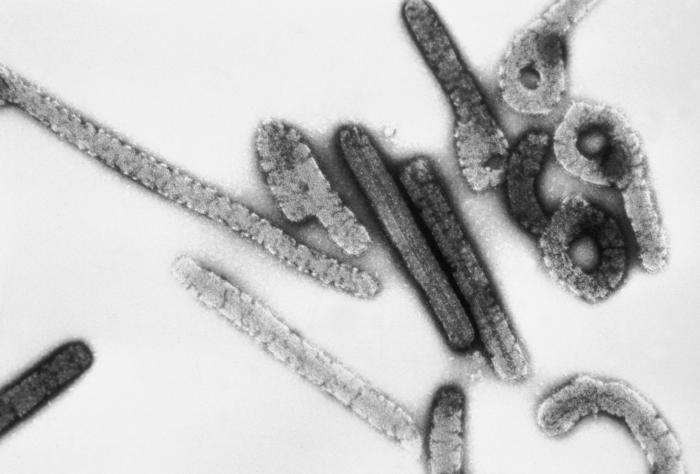
- Marburg virus structure, genome, and transmission electron micrograph

Virus classification
- (unranked): Virus
- Realm: Riboviria
- Kingdom: Orthornavirae
- Phylum: Negarnaviricota
- Class: Monjiviricetes
- Order: Mononegavirales
- Family: Filoviridae
- Genus: Marburgvirus

Species and member viruses
- Marburg marburgvirus; Marburg virus; Ravn virus

= Marburgvirus =

Genus of virus

The genus Marburgvirus is the taxonomic home of Marburg marburgvirus, whose members are the two known marburgviruses, Marburg virus (MARV) and Ravn virus (RAVV). Both viruses cause Marburg virus disease in humans and nonhuman primates, a form of viral hemorrhagic fever. Both are select agents, World Health Organization Risk Group 4 Pathogens (requiring Biosafety Level 4-equivalent containment), National Institutes of Health/National Institute of Allergy and Infectious Diseases Category A Priority Pathogens, Centers for Disease Control and Prevention Category A Bioterrorism Agents, and are listed as Biological Agents for Export Control by the Australia Group.

== Use of term ==
The genus Marburgvirus is a virological taxon included in the family Filoviridae, order Mononegavirales. The genus currently includes a single virus species, Marburg marburgvirus. The members of the genus (i.e. the actual physical entities) are called marburgviruses. The name Marburgvirus is derived from the city of Marburg in Hesse, West Germany (where Marburg virus was first discovered), and the taxonomic suffix -virus (which denotes a virus genus). Even though the virus was named after the city of Marburg, Dr. Ana Gligić, lead virologist at a laboratory in Belgrade, was first who managed to isolate the virus.

== Previous designations ==
Until 1998, the family Filoviridae contained only one genus, Filovirus. Once it became clear that marburgviruses and ebolaviruses are fundamentally different, this genus was abolished and a genus "Marburg-like viruses" was established for marburgviruses. In 2002, the genus name was changed to Marburgvirus, and in 2010 and 2011 the genus was emended.

== Genus inclusion criteria ==
A virus that fulfills the criteria for being a member of the family Filoviridae is a member of the genus Marburgvirus if

- its genome has one gene overlap
- its fourth gene (GP) encodes only one protein (GP_{1,2}) and cotranscriptional editing is not necessary for its expression
- peak infectivity of its virions is association with particles ≈665 nm in length
- its genome differs from that of Marburg virus by <50% at the nucleotide level
- its virions show almost no antigenic cross reactivity with ebolavirions

== Genus organization ==
Genus Marburgvirus (family Filoviridae, order Mononegavirales): species and viruses
| Species name | Virus name (abbreviation) |
| Marburg marburgvirus | Marburg virus (MARV) |
| Marburg marburgvirus | Ravn virus (RAVV) |

== Marburg marburgvirus ==
The species was introduced in 1998 as Marburg virus.

Because of easy confusion with its virus member Marburg virus, the species name was changed to Lake Viktoria marburgvirus in 2005.

In 2010, it was proposed to change the name to Marburg marburgvirus, and this proposal was accepted in early 2012 by the ICTV.

Marburg marburgvirus (also referred to as Lake Victoria marburgvirus) is a virological taxon (i.e. a man-made concept) included in the genus Marburgvirus, family Filoviridae, order Mononegavirales. The species has two virus members, Marburg virus (MARV) and Ravn virus (RAVV). The members of the species (i.e. the actual physical entities) are called Marburg marburgviruses. The name Marburg marburgvirus is derived from the city of Marburg in Hesse, West Germany (where Marburg virus was first discovered), and the taxonomic suffix marburgvirus (which denotes a marburgvirus species).

== Species inclusion criteria ==
A virus that fulfills the criteria for being a member of the genus Marburgvirus is a member of the species Marburg marburgvirus if it has the properties of marburgviruses (because there is currently only marburgvirus species) and if its genome differs from that of Marburg virus (variant Musoke) by <30% at the nucleotide level.
