= 2022 Ghana Marburg virus disease outbreak =

Disease outbreak in Ghana

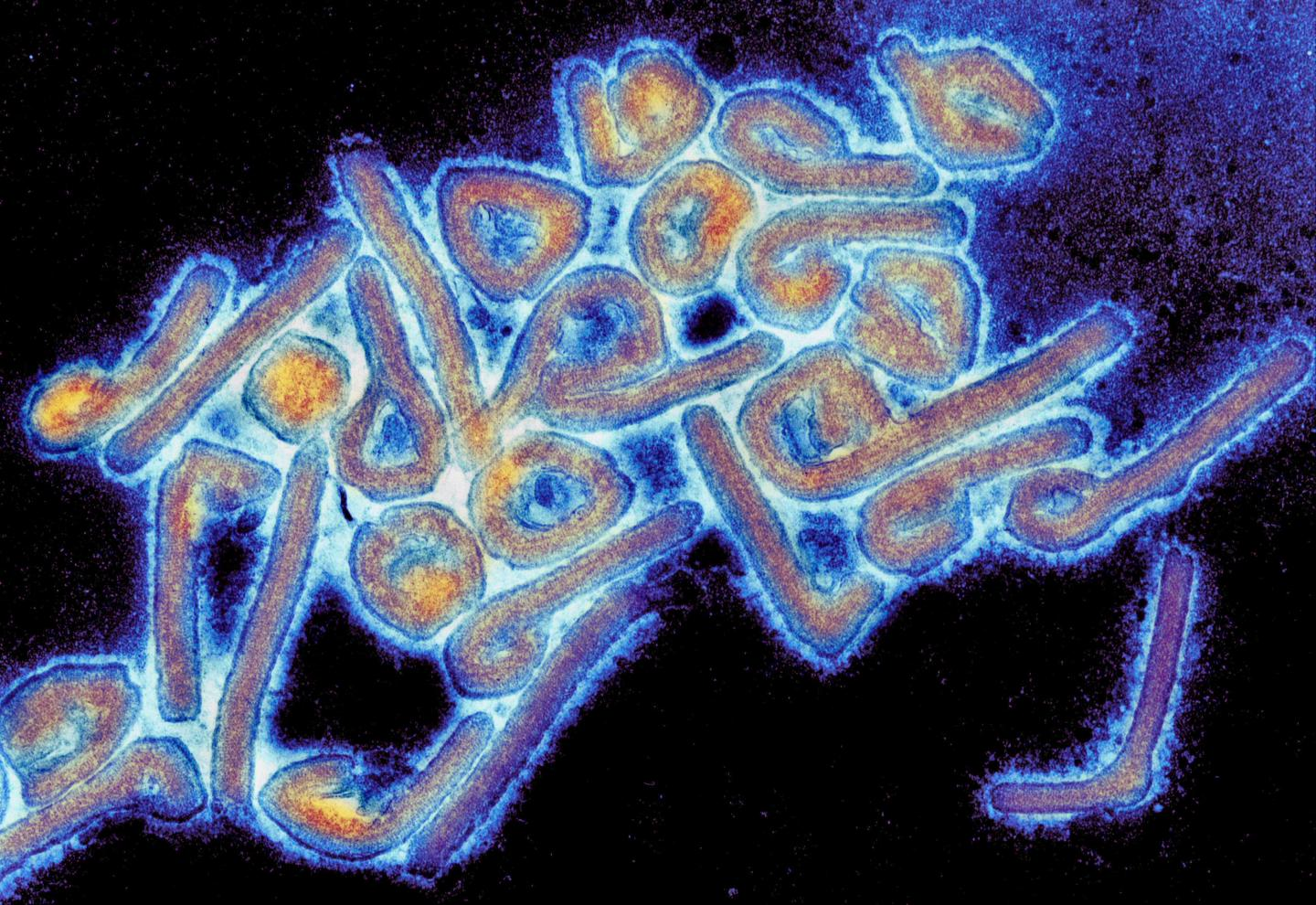
- Micrograph of Marburg viruses
- Disease: Marburg virus disease
- Location: Ashanti Region, Ghana
- Date: July 2022
- Confirmed cases: 4
- Deaths: 3
- Fatality rate: 75.00%

In July 2022, an outbreak of Marburg virus disease occurred in Ghana. Two positive cases were reported by Ghana on 8 July. After confirmation by the World Health Organization, it is the first such outbreak in Ghana. Two men aged 26 and 51 years old were infected with the disease and both cases resulted in fatalities. An additional case was identified, bringing the total to three.

== Background ==
Marburg virus disease (MVD) is a highly virulent, epidemic-prone disease, associated with a high case-fatality ratio of 24–90%. In the early phase of the disease, it is hard to distinguish the disease from other diseases. There are no specific treatments or vaccine against the Marburg virus, though supportive care increases the likelihood of survival. Fourteen outbreaks of the disease have been reported since 1967, when it was first detected, mostly in sub-Saharan Africa.

The disease's usual reservoir species is the Egyptian fruit bat. Among humans, it is transmitted via direct contact with the bodily fluids of an infected individual.

== Outbreak ==
Two individuals in the southern Ashanti Region of Ghana developed Marburg disease-like symptoms—including diarrhea, fever, nausea, and emesis—before dying in a hospital. The two victims were unrelated. Tests for Marburg virus conducted in Ghana were positive for both. This was revealed on 8 July 2022. According to the United Nations, the cases, if confirmed by the World Health Organization (WHO), will be the first such cases of Marburg in Ghana. Samples have been sent to the Pasteur Institute of Dakar, Senegal for further testing. Two more cases of the virus were confirmed in Ghana by the WHO on 27 July 2022, with a third victim succumbing to the virus.

The outbreak was confirmed by the World Health Organization on 17 July 2022, making it the first such outbreak in Ghana. The outbreak follows another that occurred in Guinea the previous year.

== Reaction ==
The WHO is preparing for a possible outbreak and is deploying experts to assist Ghana's public health efforts.
