= Ravn virus =

Virus classification
- (unranked): Virus
- Realm: Riboviria
- Kingdom: Orthornavirae
- Phylum: Negarnaviricota
- Class: Monjiviricetes
- Order: Mononegavirales
- Family: Filoviridae
- Genus: Marburgvirus
- Species: Marburg marburgvirus
- Virus: Ravn virus

Virus that causes hemorrhagic fever

Ravn virus (/ˈrævən/; RAVV) is a close relative of Marburg virus (MARV). RAVV causes Marburg virus disease, a form of viral hemorrhagic fever in humans and nonhuman primates. RAVV is a select agent, World Health Organization Risk Group 4 Pathogen (requiring Biosafety Level 4-equivalent containment), National Institutes of Health/National Institute of Allergy and Infectious Diseases Category A Priority Pathogen, Centers for Disease Control and Prevention Category A Bioterrorism Agent, and listed as a Biological Agent for Export Control by the Australia Group.

== Use of term ==
Ravn virus (today abbreviated RAVV, but then considered identical to Marburg virus) was first described in 1987 and is named after a 15-year-old Danish boy who fell ill and died from it. Today, the virus is classified as one of two members of the species Marburg marburgvirus, which is included into the genus Marburgvirus, family Filoviridae, order Mononegavirales. The name Ravn virus is derived from Ravn (the name of the Danish patient from whom this virus was first isolated) and the taxonomic suffix virus.

== Previous designations ==
Ravn virus was first introduced as a new subtype of Marburg virus in 1996. In 2006, a whole-genome analysis of all marburgviruses revealed the existence of five distinct genetic lineages. The genomes of representative isolates of four of those lineages differed from each other by only 0–7.8% on the nucleotide level, whereas representatives of the fifth lineage, including the new "subtype", differed from those of the other lineages by up to 21.3%. Consequently, the fifth genetic lineage was reclassified as a virus, Ravn virus (RAVV), distinct from the virus represented by the four more closely related lineages, Marburg virus (MARV).

== Virus inclusion criteria ==
A virus that fulfills the criteria for being a member of the species Marburg marburgvirus is a Ravn virus if it has the properties of Marburg marburgviruses and if its genome diverges from that of the prototype Marburg marburgvirus, Marburg virus variant Musoke (MARV/Mus), by ≥10% but from that of the prototype Ravn virus (variant Ravn) by <10% at the nucleotide level.

== Disease ==
RAVV is one of two marburgviruses that causes Marburg virus disease (MVD) in humans. In the past, RAVV has caused the following MVD outbreaks:

Marburg virus disease (MVD) outbreaks due to Ravn virus (RAVV) infection
Year	Geographic location	Human cases/deaths (case-fatality rate)
1987	Kenya	1/1 (100%)
1998–2000	Durba and Watsa, Democratic Republic of the Congo	? (A total of 154 cases and 128 deaths of marburgvirus infection were recorded during this outbreak. The case fatality was 83%. Two different marburgviruses, RAVV and Marburg virus (MARV), cocirculated and caused disease. It has never been published how many cases and deaths were due to RAVV or MARV infection)
2007	Uganda	1/0 (0%)

== Ecology ==
In 2009, the successful isolation of infectious RAVV was reported from caught healthy Egyptian rousettes (Rousettus aegyptiacus). This isolation, together with the isolation of infectious MARV, strongly suggests that Old World fruit bats are involved in the natural maintenance of marburgviruses.
