= Ana Gligić =

Yugoslav and Serbian virologist (1934–2025)

- Dr. Ana Gligić during an N1info.rs interview (~2020)
- Born: 6 August 1934; Ćeralije, Kingdom of Yugoslavia
- Died: 4 January 2025 (aged 90); Belgrade, Serbia
- Education: University of Belgrade
- Known for: Isolation of Marburg and smallpox viruses, research on hantaviruses
- Scientific career
- Fields: Virology, Medical Microbiology
- Workplaces: Torlak Institute, Institute of Public Health Belgrade

Ana Gligić (née Ana Filipović, 6 August 1934 – 4 January 2025) was a Yugoslav and Serbian virologist, a specialist in medical microbiology, and a senior research associate at the University of Belgrade Faculty of Medicine. She made important contributions to the understanding and control of viral hemorrhagic fevers, including the Marburg virus, and was instrumental in identifying the cause of the 1967 outbreak in Belgrade. Gligić also played a crucial role in halting the spread of the 1972 smallpox outbreak in Yugoslavia, and her later work included research on the West Nile virus and other zoonotic pathogens.

== Early life and education ==
Ana Gligić was born on 6 August 1934, in Ćeralije, Kingdom of Yugoslavia. Her early life was shaped by the events of World War II, during which she lost several family members. She completed her secondary education in Virovitica in 1953 and went on to study biology at the University of Belgrade, graduating in 1959. She began her scientific career at the "Dr. Milan Jovanović Batut" Institute of Public Health, and later joined the newly established Institute of Virology, Vaccines, and Sera "Torlak" in 1960.

== Career ==
=== Marburg virus research ===
In 1967, Gligić participated in the Yugoslav response to the first outbreak of Marburg virus disease outside of Africa. The infection occurred among laboratory workers in Belgrade who had handled tissues from African green monkeys (Cercopithecus aethiops) imported from Uganda. She played a central role in isolating the virus from clinical samples, contributing significantly to global understanding of filoviruses.

Throughout her early career at the Torlak Institute, Gligić collaborated with German virologist Professor Rudolf Siegert, co-editor of the monograph Marburg Virus Disease (Springer, 1971). Together, they co-authored a chapter documenting clinical and epidemiological observations during the 1967 outbreak.

=== Smallpox outbreak (1972) ===
In March 1972, following a growing number of unexplained febrile cases in Kosovo and Metohija, Ana Gligić was urgently called to the Torlak Institute to analyze samples collected from the region. On the night of 15 March, she received the specimens and, by early morning, confirmed the presence of the smallpox virus—marking the return of the disease to Europe for the first time in decades. The outbreak had originated from Ibrahim Hoti, a pilgrim returning from the Middle East, who unknowingly transmitted the virus to several individuals, including teacher Latif Mumdžić. Mumdžić’s illness went unrecognized during hospitalizations in Novi Pazar, Čačak, and Belgrade, facilitating further spread.

Once the diagnosis was confirmed, Gligić joined national containment efforts, often traveling by car or helicopter to infected areas. She personally led the inactivation of the smallpox virus at the Torlak Institute, ensuring its safe destruction. Reflecting on the night she was summoned, she said: "I felt like a soldier. They invested in my education so I could be useful in such moments. It would have been a betrayal not to respond."

=== Hantavirus research ===
Her research on Hantavirus hemorrhagic fever with renal syndrome (HFRS) and isolation of hantaviruses unique to the Balkans gained her international recognition. In 1992, she co-authored the first scientific report describing the "Belgrade virus," a novel hantavirus strain isolated in Yugoslavia. From the early 1980s, Gligić closely collaborated with Korean virologist Professor Ho Wang Lee, the discoverer of the Hantaan virus. She was a founding and active member of the International Society for Hantaviruses, significantly contributing to the global scientific exchange in this field.

=== Other pathogen research ===
In addition to her work on viral hemorrhagic fevers, Gligić conducted research on the West Nile virus, monitoring its spread and epidemiological risk in Southeastern Europe. She was also involved in laboratory studies of Coxiella burnetii, the bacterium that causes Q fever, focusing on zoonotic transmission and biosafety.

Throughout her early career at the Torlak Institute, Gligić collaborated with German virologist Professor Rudolf Siegert, co-editor of the monograph Marburg Virus Disease (Springer, 1971). Together, they co-authored a chapter documenting clinical and epidemiological observations during the 1967 outbreak.

== Recognition and legacy ==
In 2025, The Lancet Infectious Diseases published an obituary recognizing Gligić as a "renowned virologist and expert in medical microbiology" and concluded: "The world will not forget her contribution to science and health care; she will be remembered forever."

== Selected publications ==
- Gligić, A.; Stojanović, R.; Obradović, M.; Radović, I.; Nikolić, M.; Shelokov, A. (1971). "Two cases of Cercopithecus-monkey-associated haemorrhagic fever". Bulletin of the World Health Organization. 45(5–6): 567–573. PMID 5316914.
- Gligić, A. (2009). "A forgotten episode of Marburg virus disease: Belgrade, Yugoslavia, 1967". Microbiology and Molecular Biology Reviews. 73(4): 935–944. doi:10.1128/MMBR.00022-09.
- Gligić, A. et al. (1992). "Belgrade Virus: A New Hantavirus Causing Severe Hemorrhagic Fever with Renal Syndrome in Yugoslavia". The Journal of Infectious Diseases. 166(1): 113–120. doi:10.1093/infdis/166.1.113.
- Ristanović, E. et al. (2016). "Smallpox as an actual biothreat: lessons learned from its outbreak in ex-Yugoslavia in 1972". Ann Ist Super Sanita. 52(4): 587–597. doi:10.4415/ANN_16_04_21.
