= 2023 Tanzania Marburg virus disease outbreak =

The 2023 Tanzania Marburg virus disease outbreak lasted from March until June. It was first reported on 21 March 2023 by the Ministry of Health of Tanzania and the first time that Tanzania reported an outbreak of Marburg virus disease. On 2 June 2023, Tanzania declared the outbreak over.

== Background ==
Marburg virus disease is a viral hemorrhagic fever caused by the Marburg virus, with a case fatality ratio of up to 88 percent. Symptoms are similar to Ebola virus disease and like Ebola, Marburg virus spreads through contact with body fluids of infected people. There are no vaccines or antiviral treatments for Marburg. While there had not been an outbreak in Tanzania, the virus had been identified in neighboring countries and the reservoir, the Egyptian fruit bat, is known to be present there.

== Outbreak ==
On 16 March 2023, the Ministry of Health of Tanzania announced that seven cases and five deaths from an unknown disease had been reported in two villages in Bukoba district, Kagera region, northern Tanzania. The cases were later confirmed as Marburg virus infection and announced as an outbreak on 21 March 2023. Though there is an ongoing outbreak of marburg virus disease in Equatorial Guinea, so far, there is no evidence of an epidemiological link between the two outbreaks.

As of 8 May, nine cases were reported, including eight laboratory confirmed cases and one probable case. The cases had all been in the Bukoba district of Kagera Region and appeared to be epidemiologically linked. Per an 8 May 2023 press release from the World Health Organization, three patients recovered and six died; cases ranged in age from 1 to 59 years old (median 35-year-old), and two cases were among healthcare workers (one of which died). Males were the most affected (6 of the 9 cases). On 2 June 2023, Tanzania declared the outbreak over.

== See also ==
- 2023 Marburg virus disease outbreak in Equatorial Guinea
- List of other Filoviridae outbreaks
