= Marburg virus disease =

Human viral disease

- Other names: Marburg hemorrhagic fever
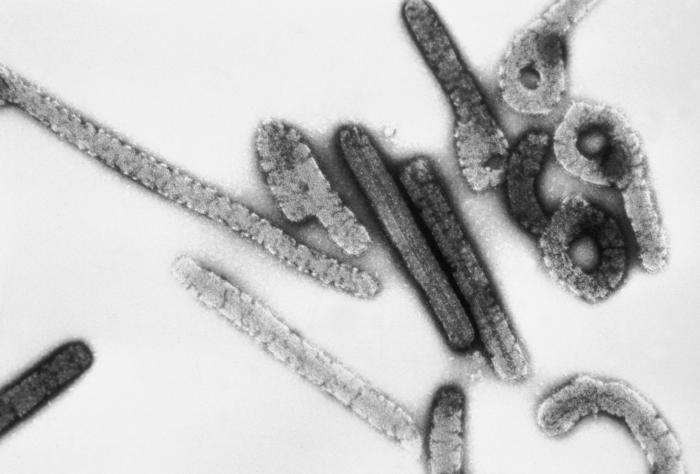
- Transmission electron micrograph of Marburg virus
- Specialty: Infectious diseases
- Symptoms: Fever, weakness, muscle pain
- Usual onset: 2–21 days after exposure
- Causes: MV
- Risk factors: Direct contact with bodily fluids of individuals infected with the virus
- Diagnostic method: Blood test
- Differential diagnosis: Ebola virus disease
- Treatment: There is no treatment, only immediate supportive care
- Frequency: Rare
- Deaths: 24–88% case fatality rate

Marburg virus disease (MVD), formerly known as Marburg hemorrhagic fever (MHF), is a viral hemorrhagic fever in human and non-human primates caused by either of the two Marburgviruses: Marburg virus (MARV) and Ravn virus (RAVV). Its clinical symptoms are very similar to those of Ebola virus disease (EVD).

Egyptian fruit bats are believed to be the normal carrier in nature and Marburg virus RNA has been isolated from them.

== Signs and symptoms ==
The most detailed study on the frequency, onset, and duration of MVD clinical signs and symptoms was performed during the 1998–2000 mixed MARV/RAVV disease outbreak. A skin rash, red or purple spots (e.g. petechiae or purpura), bruises, and hematomas (especially around needle injection sites) are typical hemorrhagic manifestations. However, contrary to popular belief, hemorrhage does not lead to hypovolemia and is not the cause of death (total blood loss is minimal except during labor). Instead, death occurs due to multiple organ dysfunction syndrome (MODS) due to fluid redistribution, hypotension, disseminated intravascular coagulation, and focal tissue necroses.

Clinical phases of Marburg hemorrhagic fever's presentation are described below. Note that phases overlap due to variability between cases.

1. Incubation: 2–21 days, averaging 5–9 days.
2. Generalization Phase: Day 1 up to Day 5 from the onset of clinical symptoms. MHF presents with a high fever 104 °F (~40˚C) and a sudden, severe headache, with accompanying chills, fatigue, nausea, vomiting, diarrhea, pharyngitis, maculopapular rash, abdominal pain, conjunctivitis, and malaise.
3. Early Organ Phase: Day 5 up to Day 13. Symptoms include prostration, dyspnea, edema, conjunctival injection, viral exanthema, and CNS symptoms, including encephalitis, confusion, delirium, apathy, and aggression. Hemorrhagic symptoms typically occur late and herald the end of the early organ phase, leading either to eventual recovery or worsening and death. Symptoms include bloody stools, ecchymoses, blood leakage from venipuncture sites, mucosal and visceral hemorrhaging, and possibly hematemesis.
4. Late Organ Phase: Day 13 up to Day 21+. Symptoms bifurcate into two constellations for survivors and fatal cases. Survivors will enter a convalescence phase, experiencing myalgia, fibromyalgia, hepatitis, asthenia, ocular symptoms, and psychosis. Fatal cases continue to deteriorate, experiencing continued fever, obtundation, coma, convulsions, diffuse coagulopathy, metabolic disturbances, shock and death, with death typically occurring between days 8 and 16.

The WHO also writes that at the phase of gastrointestinal symptoms' predomination, "the appearance of patients...has been described as showing 'ghost-like' drawn features, deep-set eyes, expressionless faces, and extreme lethargy."

== Causes ==
Genus Marburgvirus: species and its MVD-causing viruses
Species name	Virus name (Abbreviation)
Marburg marburgvirus*	Marburg virus (MARV; previously MBGV)
Marburg marburgvirus*	Ravn virus (RAVV; previously MARV-Ravn)
"*" denotes the type species.

MVD is caused by two viruses; Marburg virus (MARV) and Ravn virus (RAVV), family Filoviridae.

Marburgviruses are endemic in arid woodlands of equatorial Africa. Most marburgvirus infections were repeatedly associated with people visiting natural caves or working in mines. In 2009, the successful isolation of infectious MARV and RAVV was reported from healthy Egyptian fruit bats caught in caves. This isolation strongly suggests that Old World fruit bats are involved in the natural maintenance of marburgviruses and that visiting bat-infested caves is a risk factor for acquiring marburgvirus infections. Further studies are necessary to establish whether Egyptian rousettes are the actual hosts of MARV and RAVV or whether they get infected via contact with another animal and therefore serve only as intermediate hosts. Another risk factor is contact with nonhuman primates, although only one outbreak of MVD (in 1967) was due to contact with infected monkeys.

Contrary to Ebola virus disease (EVD), which has been associated with heavy rains after long periods of dry weather, triggering factors for spillover of marburgviruses into the human population have not yet been described.

== Transmission ==
The details of the initial transmission of MVD to humans remain incompletely understood. Transmission most likely occurs from Egyptian fruit bats or another natural host, such as non-human primates or through the consumption of bushmeat, but the specific routes and body fluids involved are unknown. Human-to-human transmission of MVD occurs through direct contact with infected bodily fluids such as blood. Transmission events are relatively rare – there have been only 11 recorded outbreaks of MARV between 1975 and 2011, with one event involving both MARV and RAVV.

== Diagnosis ==
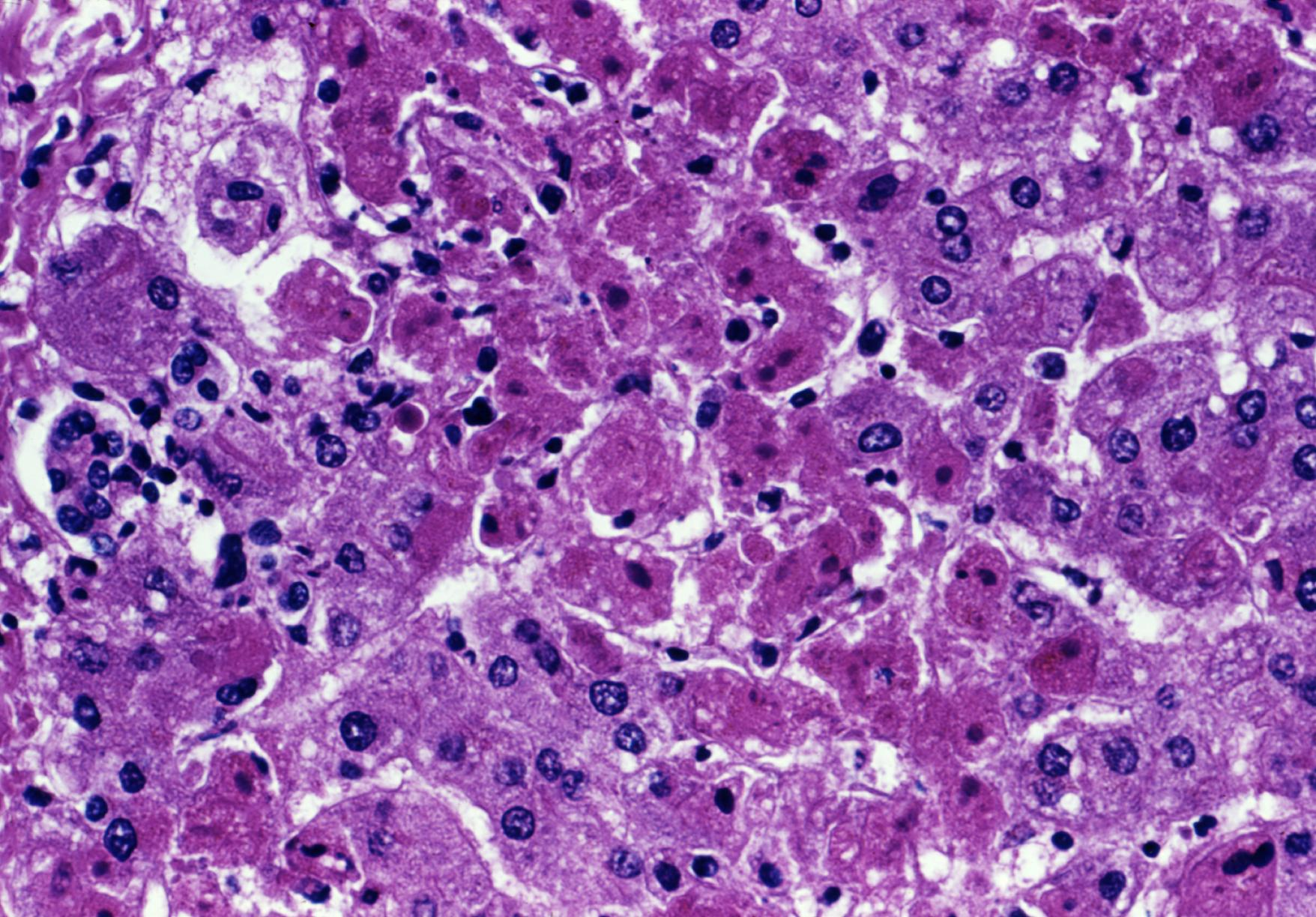
Marburg virus liver injury

MVD is clinically indistinguishable from Ebola virus disease (EVD), and it can also easily be confused with many other diseases prevalent in Equatorial Africa, such as other viral hemorrhagic fevers, falciparum malaria, typhoid fever, shigellosis, rickettsial diseases such as typhus, cholera, gram-negative sepsis, borreliosis such as relapsing fever or EHEC enteritis. Other infectious diseases that ought to be included in the differential diagnosis include leptospirosis, scrub typhus, plague, Q fever, candidiasis, histoplasmosis, trypanosomiasis, visceral leishmaniasis, hemorrhagic smallpox, measles, and fulminant viral hepatitis. Non-infectious diseases that can be confused with MVD are acute promyelocytic leukemia, hemolytic uremic syndrome, snake envenomation, clotting factor deficiencies/platelet disorders, thrombotic thrombocytopenic purpura, hereditary hemorrhagic telangiectasia, Kawasaki disease, and even warfarin intoxication.

The most important indicator that may lead to the suspicion of MVD at clinical examination is the medical history of the patient, in particular the travel and occupational history (which countries and caves were visited) and the patient's exposure to wildlife (exposure to bats or bat excrements). MVD can be confirmed by isolation of marburgviruses from or by detection of marburgvirus antigen or genomic or subgenomic RNAs in patient blood or serum samples during the acute phase of MVD. Marburgvirus isolation is usually performed by inoculation of grivet kidney epithelial Vero E6 or MA-104 cell cultures or by inoculation of human adrenal carcinoma SW-13 cells, all of which react to infection with characteristic cytopathic effects. Filovirions can easily be visualized and identified in cell culture by electron microscopy due to their unique filamentous shapes, but electron microscopy cannot differentiate the various filoviruses alone despite some overall length differences. Immunofluorescence assays are used to confirm marburgvirus presence in cell cultures. During an outbreak, virus isolation and electron microscopy are most often not feasible options. The most common diagnostic methods are therefore RT-PCR in conjunction with antigen-capture ELISA, which can be performed in field or mobile hospitals and laboratories. Indirect immunofluorescence assays (IFAs) are not used for diagnosis of MVD in the field anymore.

=== Classification ===
Marburg virus disease (MVD) is the official name listed in the World Health Organization's International Statistical Classification of Diseases and Related Health Problems 10 (ICD-10) for the human disease caused by any of the two marburgviruses; Marburg virus (MARV) and Ravn virus (RAVV). In the scientific literature, Marburg hemorrhagic fever (MHF) is often used as an unofficial alternative name for the same disease. Both disease names are derived from the German city Marburg, where MARV was first discovered.

== Prevention ==
Marburgviruses are highly infectious, but not very contagious. They do not get transmitted by aerosol during natural MVD outbreaks. Due to the absence of an approved vaccine, prevention of MVD therefore relies predominantly on quarantine of confirmed or high probability cases, proper personal protective equipment, and sterilization and disinfection.

=== Vaccine development ===
There are currently no Food and Drug Administration-approved vaccines for the prevention of MVD. Many candidate vaccines have been developed and tested in various animal models. Of those, the most promising ones are DNA vaccines or based on Venezuelan equine encephalitis virus replicons, vesicular stomatitis Indiana virus (VSIV) or filovirus-like particles (VLPs) as all of these candidates could protect nonhuman primates from marburgvirus-induced disease. DNA vaccines have entered clinical trials.

There is not yet an approved vaccine, because of economic factors in vaccine development, and because filoviruses killed few before the 2010s.

=== Endemic zones ===
The natural maintenance hosts of marburgviruses remain to be identified unequivocally. However, the isolation of both MARV and RAVV from bats and the association of several MVD outbreaks with bat-infested mines or caves strongly suggests that bats are involved in Marburg virus transmission to humans. Avoidance of contact with bats and abstaining from visits to caves is highly recommended, but may not be possible for those working in mines or people dependent on bats as a food source.

=== During outbreaks ===
Since marburgviruses are not spread via aerosol, the most straightforward prevention method during MVD outbreaks is to avoid direct (skin-to-skin) contact with patients, their excretions and body fluids, and any possibly contaminated materials and utensils. Patients should be isolated, but still are safe to be visited by family members. Medical staff should be trained in and apply strict barrier nursing techniques (disposable face mask, gloves, goggles, and a gown at all times). Traditional burial rituals, especially those requiring embalming of bodies, should be discouraged or modified, ideally with the help of local traditional healers.

=== In the laboratory ===
Marburgviruses are World Health Organization Risk Group 4 Pathogens, requiring Biosafety Level 4-equivalent containment, laboratory researchers have to be properly trained in BSL-4 practices and wear proper personal protective equipment.

== Treatment ==
There is currently no effective marburgvirus-specific therapy for MVD. Treatment is primarily supportive in nature and includes minimizing invasive procedures, balancing fluids and electrolytes to counter dehydration, administration of anticoagulants early in infection to prevent or control disseminated intravascular coagulation, administration of procoagulants late in infection to control hemorrhaging, maintaining oxygen levels, pain management, and administration of antibiotics or antifungals to treat secondary infections.

== Prognosis ==
Although supportive care can improve survival chances, Marburg virus disease is fatal in the majority of cases. The case fatality rate has been estimated to be 61.9%.

== Epidemiology ==
=== Pandemic potential ===
The WHO identifies marburg virus disease as having pandemic potential.

=== Historical outbreaks ===
Below is a table of outbreaks concerning MVD from 1967 to 2025:

Marburg virus disease outbreaks
Year	Country	Virus	Human cases	Human deaths	Case fatality rate	Notes
1967	West Germany; Yugoslavia	MARV	31	7	23%	
1975	Rhodesia; South Africa	MARV	3	1	33%	
1980	Kenya	MARV	2	1	50%	
1987	Kenya	RAVV	1	1	100%	
1988	Soviet Union	MARV	1	1	100%	
1990	Soviet Union	MARV	1	0	0%	
1998–2000	Democratic Republic of the Congo	MARV & RAVV	154	128	83%	
2004–2005	Angola	MARV	252	227	90%	
2007	Uganda	MARV & RAVV	4	1	25%	
2008	Uganda; Netherlands; United States	MARV	2	1	50%	
2012	Uganda	MARV	18	9	50%	
2014	Uganda	MARV	1	1	100%	
2017	Uganda	MARV	3	3	100%	
2021	Guinea	MARV	1	1	100%	
2022	Ghana	MARV	3	2	66.66%	
2023	Equatorial Guinea	MARV	40	35	88%	
2023	Tanzania	MARV	9	6	66%	
2024	Rwanda	MARV	58	13	22%	
2025	Tanzania	MARV	9	8	88%	
	TOTAL	MARV & RAVV	593	446	75%	

=== 1967 outbreak ===
MVD was first documented in 1967, when 31 people became ill in the German towns of Marburg and Frankfurt am Main, and in Belgrade, Yugoslavia. The outbreak involved 25 primary MARV infections and seven deaths, and six nonlethal secondary cases. The outbreak was traced to infected grivets (species Chlorocebus aethiops) imported from an undisclosed location in Uganda and used in developing poliomyelitis vaccines. The monkeys were received by Behringwerke, a Marburg company founded by the first winner of the Nobel Prize in Medicine, Emil von Behring. The company, which at the time was owned by Hoechst, was originally set up to develop sera against tetanus and diphtheria. Primary infections occurred in Behringwerke laboratory staff while working with grivet tissues or tissue cultures without adequate personal protective equipment. Secondary cases involved two physicians, a nurse, a post-mortem attendant, and the wife of a veterinarian. All secondary cases had direct contact, usually involving blood, with a primary case. Both physicians became infected through accidental skin pricks when drawing blood from patients.

=== 1975 cases ===
In 1975, an Australian tourist became infected with MARV in Rhodesia (today Zimbabwe). He died in a hospital in Johannesburg, South Africa. His girlfriend and an attending nurse were subsequently infected with MVD, but survived.

=== 1980 cases ===
A case of MARV infection occurred in 1980 in Kenya. A French man, who worked as an electrical engineer in a sugar factory in Nzoia (close to Bungoma) at the base of Mount Elgon (which contains Kitum Cave), became infected by unknown means and died on 15 January shortly after admission to Nairobi Hospital. The attending physician contracted MVD, but survived. A popular science account of these cases can be found in Richard Preston's book The Hot Zone (the French man is referred to under the pseudonym "Charles Monet", whereas the physician is identified under his real name, Shem Musoke).

=== 1987 case ===
In 1987, a single lethal case of RAVV infection occurred in a 15-year-old Danish boy, who spent his vacation in Kisumu, Kenya. He had visited Kitum Cave on Mount Elgon prior to travelling to Mombasa, where he developed clinical signs of infection. The boy died after transfer to Nairobi Hospital. A popular science account of this case can be found in Richard Preston's book The Hot Zone (the boy is referred to under the pseudonym "Peter Cardinal").

=== 1988 laboratory infection ===
In 1988, researcher Nikolai Ustinov infected himself lethally with MARV after accidentally pricking himself with a syringe used for inoculation of guinea pigs. The accident occurred at the Scientific-Production Association "Vektor" (today the State Research Center of Virology and Biotechnology "Vektor") in Koltsovo, USSR (today Russia). Very little information is publicly available about this MVD case because Ustinov's experiments were classified. A popular science account of this case can be found in Ken Alibek's book Biohazard.

=== 1990 laboratory infection ===
Another laboratory accident occurred at the Scientific-Production Association "Vektor" (today the State Research Center of Virology and Biotechnology "Vektor") in Koltsovo, USSR, when a scientist contracted MARV by unknown means.

=== 1998–2000 outbreak ===
A major MVD outbreak occurred among illegal gold miners around Goroumbwa mine in Durba and Watsa, Democratic Republic of Congo from 1998 to 2000, when co-circulating MARV and RAVV caused 154 cases of MVD and 128 deaths. The outbreak ended with the flooding of the mine.

=== 2004–2005 outbreak ===
In early 2005, the World Health Organization (WHO) began investigating an outbreak of viral hemorrhagic fever in Angola, which was centered in the northeastern Uíge Province but also affected many other provinces. The Angolan government had to ask for international assistance, as there were only approximately 1,200 doctors in the entire country and provinces that had few as two. Health care workers also complained about a shortage of basic personal protective equipment. Médecins Sans Frontières (MSF) reported that when their team arrived at the provincial hospital at the center of the outbreak, they found it operating without water and electricity. Contact tracing was complicated by the fact that the country's roads and other infrastructure were devastated after nearly three decades of civil war and the countryside remained littered with land mines.

Americo Boa Vida Hospital in the Angolan capital, Luanda, set up a special isolation ward to treat patients from the countryside. Due to the high fatality rate of MVD, some people came to be suspicious of and hostile towards hospitals and medical workers. For instance, a specially-equipped isolation ward at the provincial hospital in Uíge was reported to be empty during much of the epidemic, even though the facility was at the center of the outbreak. WHO was forced to implement what it described as a "harm reduction strategy" by distributing disinfectants to affected families who refused hospital care. Of the 252 people who contracted MVD, 227 died.

=== 2007 cases ===
In 2007, four miners became infected with marburgviruses in Kamwenge District, Uganda. The first case, a 29-year-old man, became symptomatic on July 4, 2007, was admitted to a hospital on July 7, and died on July 13. Contact tracing revealed that the man had had prolonged close contact with two colleagues (a 22-year-old man and a 23-year-old man), who experienced clinical signs of infection before his disease onset. Both men had been admitted to hospitals in June and survived their infections, which were proven to be due to MARV. A fourth, 25-year-old man, developed MVD clinical signs in September and was shown to be infected with RAVV. He also survived the infection.

=== 2008 cases ===
On July 10, 2008, the Netherlands National Institute for Public Health and the Environment reported that a 41-year-old Dutch woman, who had visited Python Cave in Maramagambo Forest during her holiday in Uganda, had MVD due to MARV infection, and had been admitted to a hospital in the Netherlands. The woman died under treatment in the Leiden University Medical Centre in Leiden on July 11. The Ugandan Ministry of Health closed the cave after this case. On January 9 of that year an infectious diseases physician notified the Colorado Department of Public Health and the Environment that a 44-year-old American woman who had returned from Uganda had been hospitalized with a fever of unknown origin. At the time, serologic testing was negative for viral hemorrhagic fever. She was discharged on January 19, 2008. After the death of the Dutch patient and the discovery that the American woman had visited Python Cave, further testing confirmed the patient demonstrated MARV antibodies and RNA.

=== 2017 Uganda outbreak ===
Kween District in Uganda

In October 2017 an outbreak of Marburg virus disease was detected in Kween District, Eastern Uganda. All three initial cases (belonging to one family – two brothers and one sister) had died by 3 November. The fourth case – a health care worker – developed symptoms on 4 November and was admitted to a hospital. The first confirmed case traveled to Kenya before the death. A close contact of the second confirmed case traveled to Kampala. It is reported that several hundred people may have been exposed to infection.

=== 2021 Guinean cases ===
In August 2021, two months after the re-emergent Ebola epidemic in the Guéckédou prefecture was declared over, a case of the Marburg disease was confirmed by health authorities through laboratory analysis. Other potential case of the disease in a contact awaits official results. This was the first case of the Marburg hemorrhagic fever confirmed to happen in West Africa. The case of Marburg also has been identified in Guéckédou. During the outbreak, a total of one confirmed case, who died (CFR=100%), and 173 contacts were identified, including 14 high-risk contacts based on exposure. Among them, 172 were followed for a period of 21 days, of which none developed symptoms. One high-risk contact was lost to follow up. Sequencing of an isolate from the Guinean patient showed that this outbreak was caused by the Angola-like Marburg virus. A colony of Egyptian rousettus bats (reservoir host of Marburg virus) was found in close proximity (4.5 km) to the village, where the Marburg virus disease outbreak emerged in 2021. Two sampled fruit bats from this colony were PCR-positive on the Marburg virus.

=== 2022 Ghanaian cases ===
In July 2022, preliminary analysis of samples taken from two patients – both deceased – in Ghana indicated the cases were positive for Marburg. However, per standard procedure, the samples were sent to the Pasteur Institute of Dakar for confirmation. On 17 July 2022 the two cases were confirmed by Ghana, which caused the country to declare a Marburg virus disease outbreak. An additional case was identified, bringing the total to three.

=== 2023 Equatorial Guinea outbreak ===
A disease outbreak was first reported in Equatorial Guinea on 7 February 2023, and on 13 February 2023, it was identified as being Marburg virus disease. It was the first time the disease was detected in the country. Neighbouring Cameroon detected two suspected cases of Marburg virus disease on 13 February 2023, but they were later ruled out. On 25 February, a suspected case of Marburg was reported in the Spanish city of Valencia, however this case was subsequently discounted. As of 4 April 2023, there were 14 confirmed cases and 28 suspected cases, including ten confirmed deaths from the disease in Equatorial Guinea. On 8 June 2023, the World Health Organization declared the outbreak over. In total, 17 laboratory-confirmed cases and 12 deaths were recorded. All the 23 probable cases reportedly died. Four patients recovered from the virus and have been enrolled in a survivors programme to receive psychosocial and other post-recovery support.

=== 2023 Tanzania outbreak ===
A Marburg virus disease outbreak in Tanzania was first reported on 21 March 2023 by the Ministry of Health of Tanzania. This was the first time that Tanzania had reported an outbreak of the disease. On 2 June 2023, Tanzania declared the outbreak over. There were 9 total infections, resulting in 6 total deaths.

=== 2024 Rwanda outbreak ===
On September 27, 2024, an outbreak of the Marburg virus was confirmed in Rwanda. As of September 29, 2024, six deaths and twenty cases had been confirmed. The Rwandan Minister of Health, Sabin Nsanzimana, confirmed that the infected were mostly healthcare workers and that contact tracing had been initiated in the country.

== Research ==
Experimentally, recombinant vesicular stomatitis Indiana virus (VSIV) expressing the glycoprotein of MARV has been used successfully in nonhuman primate models as post-exposure prophylaxis. A vaccine candidate has been effective in nonhuman primates. Experimental therapeutic regimens relying on antisense technology have shown promise, with phosphorodiamidate morpholino oligomers (PMOs) targeting the MARV genome New therapies from Sarepta and Tekmira have also been successfully used in humans as well as primates.

== See also ==
- List of other Filoviridae outbreaks
- Use in the Soviet biological weapons program
