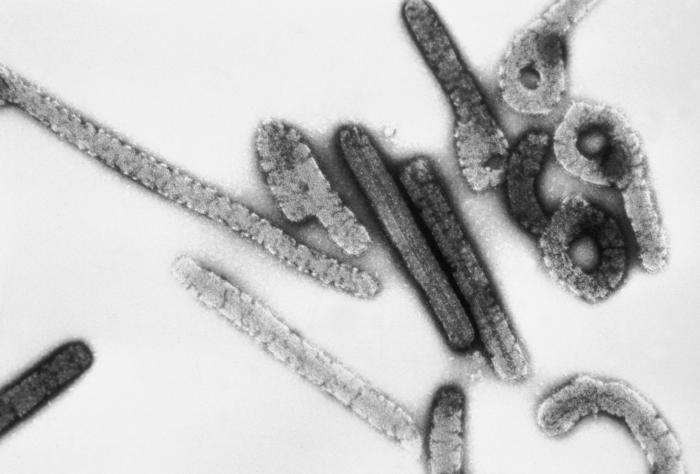
- Transmission electron micrograph of Marburg virus

Virus classification
- (unranked): Virus
- Realm: Riboviria
- Kingdom: Orthornavirae
- Phylum: Negarnaviricota
- Class: Monjiviricetes
- Order: Mononegavirales
- Family: Filoviridae
- Genus: Marburgvirus
- Species: Marburg marburgvirus
- Virus: Marburg virus

= Marburg virus =

Virus responsible for hemorrhagic fever

Marburg virus (MARV) is a hemorrhagic fever virus of the Filoviridae family of viruses and a member of the species Marburg marburgvirus, genus Marburgvirus. It causes Marburg virus disease in primates, a form of viral hemorrhagic fever. The World Health Organization (WHO) rates it as a Risk Group 4 Pathogen (requiring biosafety level 4-equivalent containment). In the United States, the National Institute of Allergy and Infectious Diseases ranks it as a Category A Priority Pathogen and the Centers for Disease Control and Prevention lists it as a Category A Bioterrorism Agent. It is also listed as a biological agent for export control by the Australia Group.

The virus can be transmitted by exposure to one species of fruit bats or it can be transmitted between people via body fluids through unprotected sex and broken skin. The disease can cause haemorrhage, fever, and other symptoms similar to Ebola, which belongs to the same family of viruses. According to the WHO, there are no approved vaccines or antiviral treatment for Marburg, but early, professional treatment of symptoms such as rehydration considerably increases survival chances.

In 2009, expanded clinical trials of an Ebola and Marburg vaccine began in Kampala, Uganda.

== History ==
=== Discovery ===
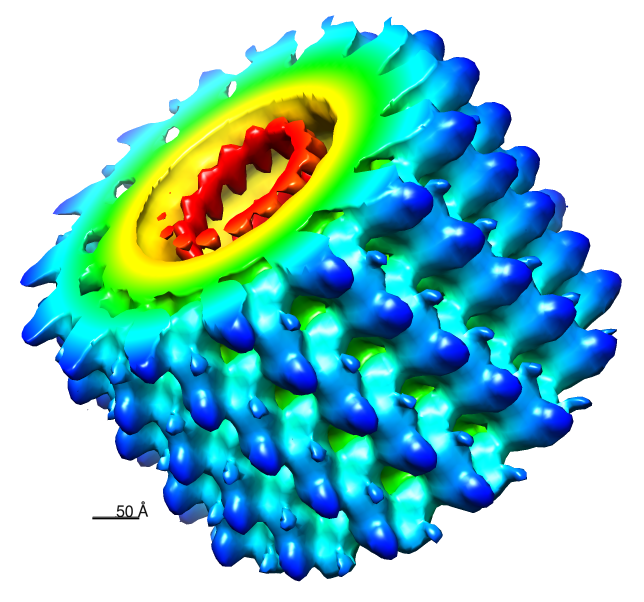
CryoEM reconstruction of a section of the Marburg virus nucleocapsid. EMDB entry.

Marburg virus was first described in 1967. It was discovered that year during a set of outbreaks of Marburg virus disease in the German cities of Marburg and Frankfurt and the Yugoslav capital Belgrade. Laboratory workers were exposed to tissues of infected grivet monkeys (the African green monkey, Chlorocebus aethiops) at the Behringwerke, a major industrial plant in Marburg which was then part of Hoechst, and later part of CSL Behring. During the outbreaks, thirty-one people became infected and seven of them died.

=== Nomenclature ===
The virus is one of two members of the species Marburgvirus, which is included in the genus Marburgvirus, family Filoviridae, and order Mononegavirales. The name Marburgvirus is derived from Marburg (the city in Hesse, Germany, where the virus was first discovered) and the taxonomic suffix virus.

Marburgvirus was first introduced under this name in 1967. The virus name was changed to Lake Victoria marburgvirus in 2005, confusingly making the only difference in distinguishing between a Marburgvirus organism and its species as a whole italicization, as in Lake Victoria marburgvirus. Still, most scientific articles continued to use the name Marburgvirus. Consequently, in 2010, the name Marburgvirus was reinstated and the species name changed.

== Virology ==
=== Genome ===
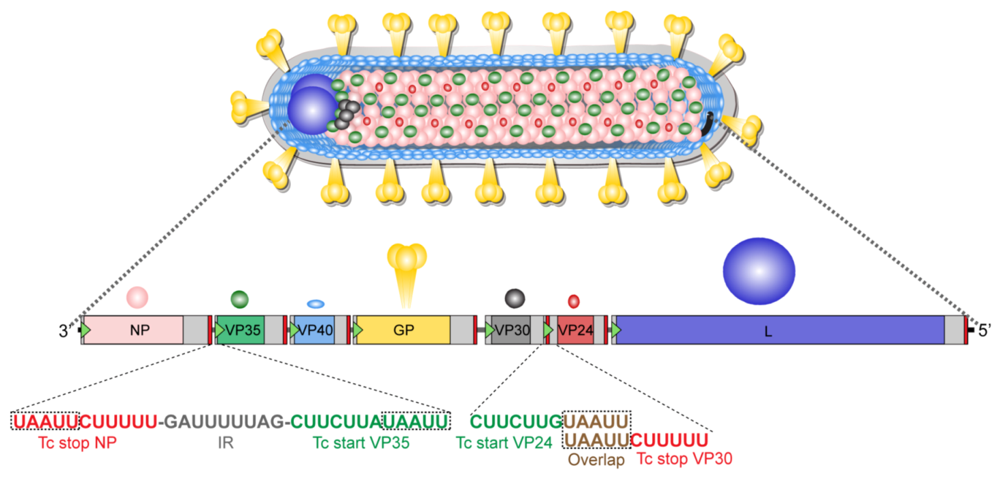
Marburg virion and genome

Like all mononegaviruses, marburg virions contain non-infectious, linear nonsegmented, single-stranded RNA genomes of negative polarity that possess inverse-complementary 3' and 5' termini, do not possess a 5' cap, are not polyadenylated, and are not covalently linked to a protein. Marburgvirus genomes are approximately 19 kbp long and contain seven genes in the order 3'-UTR-NP-VP35-VP40-GP-VP30-VP24-L-5'-UTR.

=== Structure ===
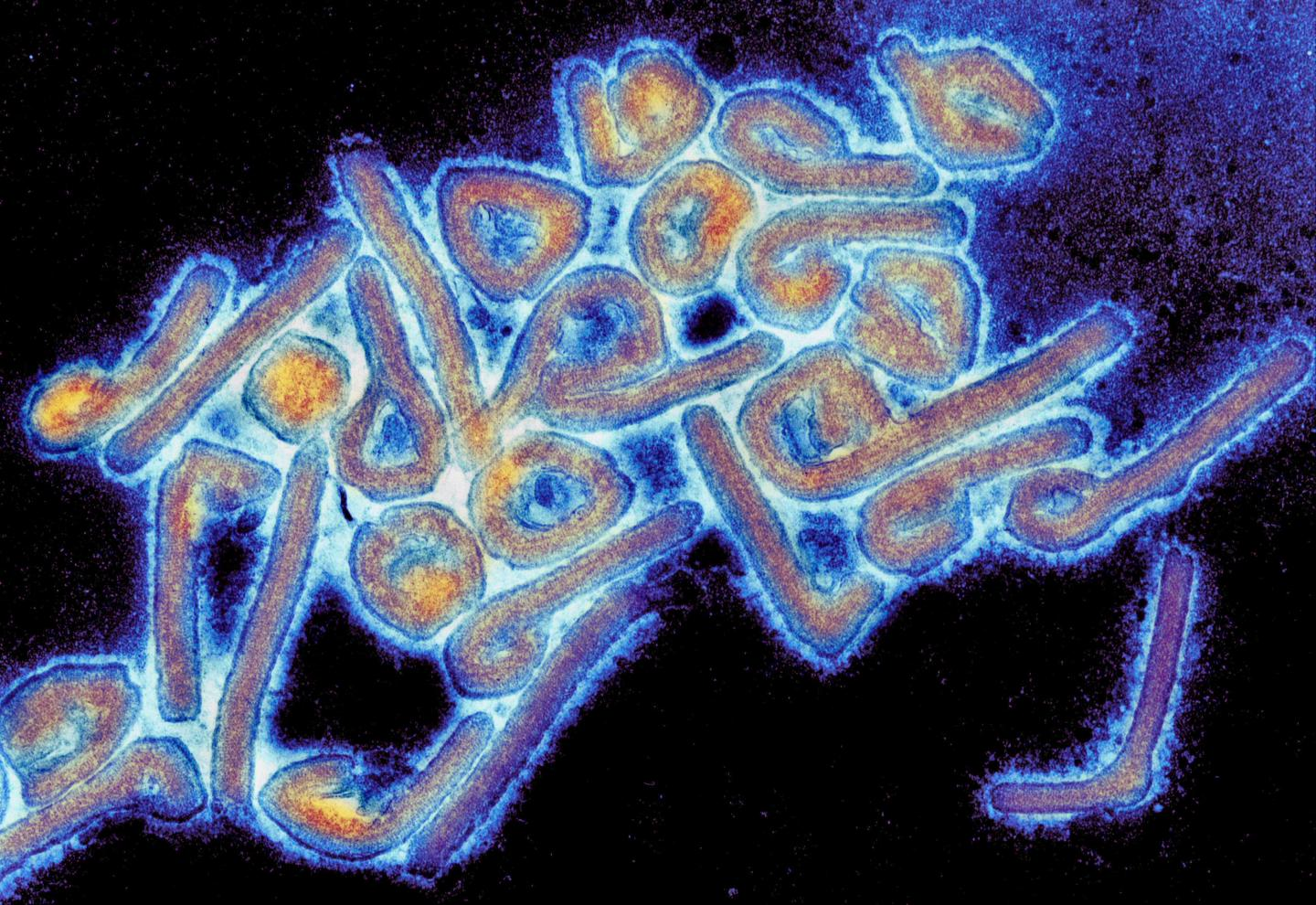
Micrograph of the Marburg viruses

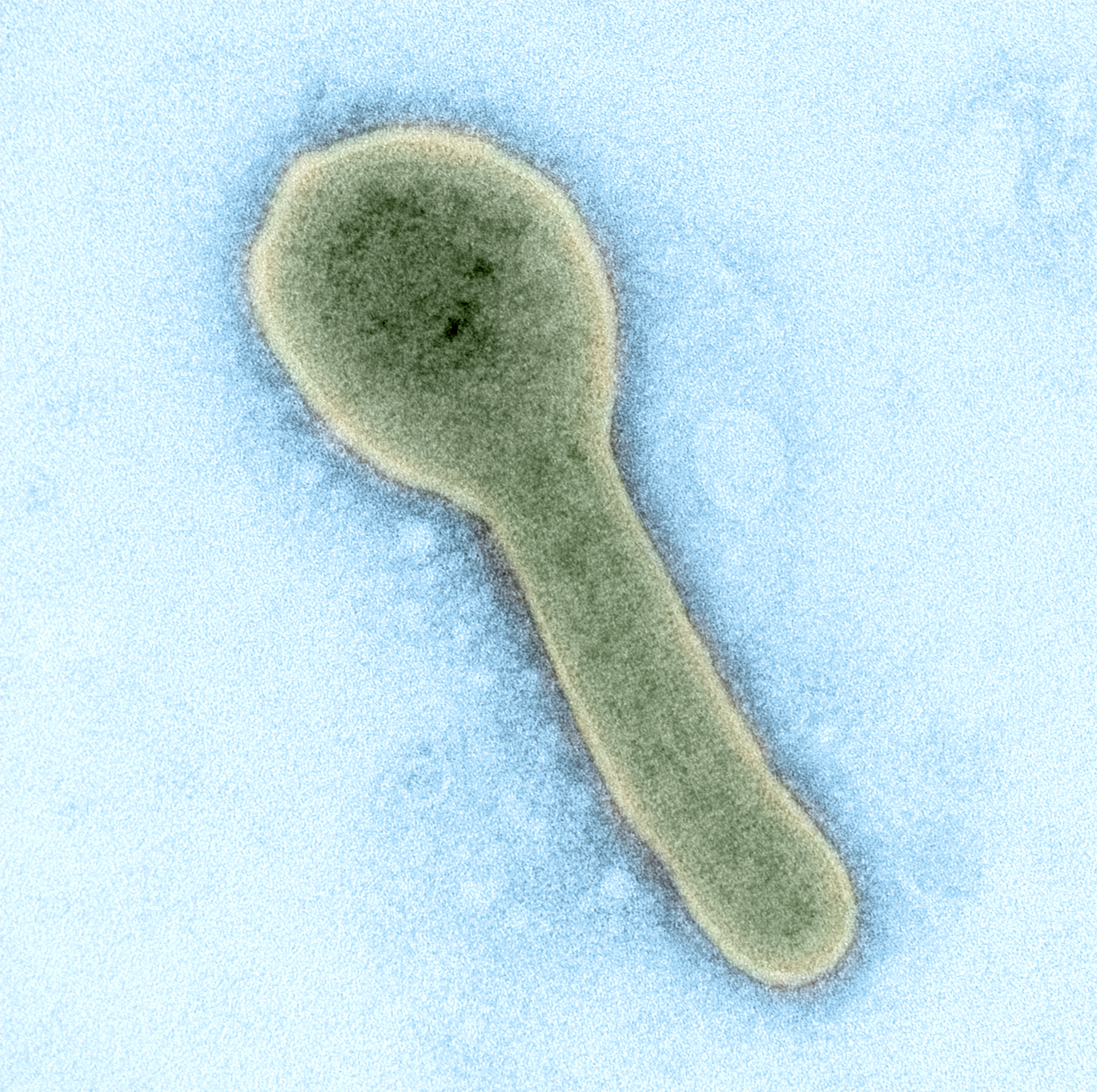
Colorized electron micrograph of a Marburg virus

Like all filoviruses, marburgvirions are filamentous particles that may appear in the shape of a shepherd's crook or in the shape of a "U" or a "6", and they may be coiled, toroid, or branched. Marburgvirions are generally 80 nm in width, but vary somewhat in length. In general, the median particle length of marburgviruses ranges from 795 to 828 nm (in contrast to ebolavirions, whose median particle length was measured to be 974–1,086 nm), but particles as long as 14,000 nm have been detected in tissue culture.

Marburgvirions consist of seven structural proteins. At the center is the helical ribonucleocapsid, which consists of genomic RNA wrapped around a polymer of nucleoproteins (NP). Associated with the ribonucleoprotein is the RNA-dependent RNA polymerase (L) with the polymerase cofactor (VP35) and a transcription activator (VP30). The ribonucleoprotein is embedded in a matrix, formed by the major (VP40) and minor (VP24) matrix proteins. These particles are surrounded by a lipid membrane derived from the host cell membrane. The membrane anchors a glycoprotein (GP_{1,2}) that projects 7 to 10 nm spikes away from its surface. While nearly identical to ebolavirions in structure, marburgvirions are antigenically distinct.

=== Entry ===
Niemann–Pick C1 (NPC1) cholesterol transporter protein appears to be essential for infection with both Ebola and Marburg virus. Two independent studies reported in the same issue of Nature showed that Ebola virus cell entry and replication requires NPC1. When cells from patients lacking NPC1 were exposed to Ebola virus in the laboratory, the cells survived and appeared immune to the virus, further indicating that Ebola relies on NPC1 to enter cells. This might imply that genetic mutations in the NPC1 gene in humans could make some people resistant to one of the deadliest known viruses affecting humans. The same studies described similar results with Marburg virus, showing that it also needs NPC1 to enter cells. Furthermore, NPC1 was shown to be critical to filovirus entry because it mediates infection by binding directly to the viral envelope glycoprotein and that the second lysosomal domain of NPC1 mediates this binding.

In one of the original studies, a small molecule was shown to inhibit Ebola virus infection by preventing the virus glycoprotein from binding to NPC1. In the other study, mice that were heterozygous for NPC1 were shown to be protected from lethal challenge with mouse-adapted Ebola virus.

=== Replication ===
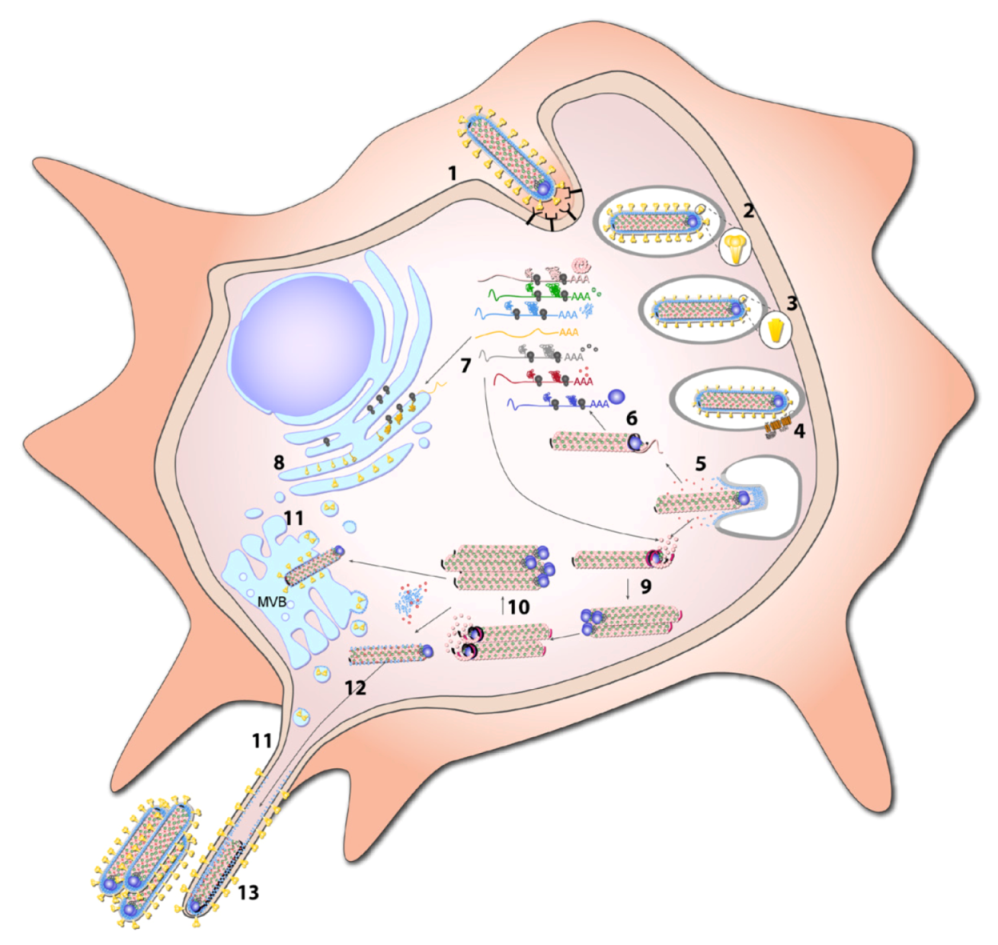
The Marburg virus replication cycle

The Marburg virus life cycle begins with virion attachment to specific cell-surface receptors, followed by fusion of the virion envelope with cellular membranes and the concomitant release of the virus nucleocapsid into the cytosol.

The virus RdRp partially uncoats the nucleocapsid and transcribes the genes into positive-stranded mRNAs, which are then translated into structural and nonstructural proteins. Marburgvirus L binds to a single promoter located at the 3' end of the genome. Transcription either terminates after a gene or continues to the next gene downstream. This means that genes close to the 3' end of the genome are transcribed in the greatest abundance, whereas those toward the 5' end are least likely to be transcribed. The gene order is therefore a simple but effective form of transcriptional regulation.

The most abundant protein produced is the nucleoprotein, whose concentration in the cell determines when L switches from gene transcription to genome replication. Replication results in full-length, positive-stranded antigenomes that are in turn transcribed into negative-stranded virus progeny genome copies. Newly synthesized structural proteins and genomes self-assemble and accumulate near the inside of the cell membrane. Virions bud off from the cell, gaining their envelopes from the cellular membrane they bud from. The mature progeny particles then infect other cells to repeat the cycle.

== Ecology ==
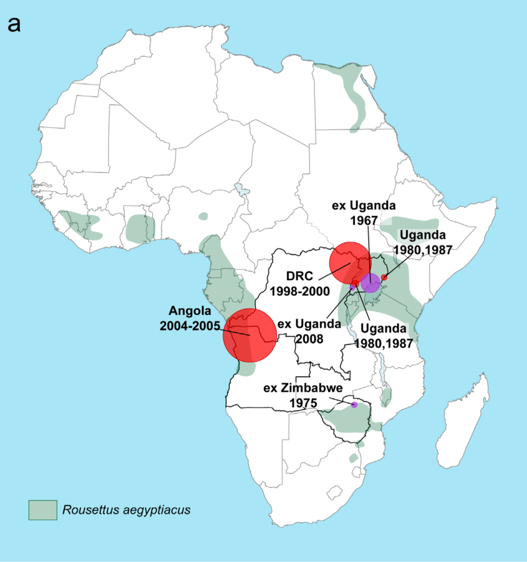
The geographic distribution of Marburg virus and Egyptian fruit bats

In 2009, the successful isolation of infectious MARV was reported from caught healthy Egyptian fruit bats (Rousettus aegyptiacus). This isolation, together with the isolation of infectious RAVV, strongly suggests that Old World fruit bats are involved in the natural maintenance of marburgviruses. Further studies are necessary to establish whether Egyptian rousettes are the actual hosts of MARV and RAVV or whether they get infected via contact with another animal and therefore serve only as intermediate hosts. In 2012 the first experimental infection study of Rousettus aegyptiacus with MARV provided further insight into the possible involvement of these bats in MARV ecology.

Experimentally infected bats developed relatively low viremia lasting at least five days, but remained healthy and did not develop any notable gross pathology. The virus also replicated to high titers in major organs (liver and spleen), and organs that might possibly be involved in virus transmission (lung, intestine, reproductive organs, salivary gland, kidney, bladder, and mammary gland). The relatively long period of viremia noted in this experiment could possibly also facilitate mechanical transmission by blood sucking arthropods in addition to infection of susceptible vertebrate hosts by direct contact with infected blood.

== Evolution ==
The viral strains fall into two clades: Ravn virus and Marburg virus. The Marburg strains can be divided into two: A and B. The A strains were isolated from Uganda (five from 1967), Kenya (1980) and Angola (2004–2005) while the B strains were from the Democratic Republic of the Congo epidemic (1999–2000) and a group of Ugandan isolates isolated in 2007–2009.

The mean evolutionary rate of the whole genome was 3.3 × 10^{−4} substitutions/site/year (credibility interval 2.0–4.8). The Marburg strains had a mean root time of the most recent common ancestor of 177.9 years ago (95% highest posterior density 87–284) suggesting an origin in the mid 19th century. In contrast, the Ravn strains origin dated back to a mean of 33.8 years ago (the early 1980s). The most probable location of the Marburg virus ancestor was Uganda whereas that of the RAVV ancestor was Kenya.

== Human disease ==
MARV is one of two Marburg viruses that causes Marburg virus disease (MVD) in humans (in the literature also often referred to as Marburg hemorrhagic fever, MHF). The other one is Ravn virus (RAVV). Both viruses fulfill the criteria for being a member of the species Marburg marburgvirus because their genomes diverge from the prototype Marburg marburgvirus or the Marburg virus variant Musoke (MARV/Mus) by <10% at the nucleotide level.

=== Recorded outbreaks ===
Year	Geographic location	Virus	Human cases	Human deaths	Case fatality rate	Notes
1967	Marburg and Frankfurt, West Germany, and Belgrade, Socialist Federal Republic of Yugoslavia	MARV	31	7	23%	Main article: 1967 Marburg virus disease outbreak Laboratory leak
1975	Rhodesia and Johannesburg, South Africa	MARV	3	1	33%	
1980	Kenya	MARV	2	1	50%	
1987	Kenya	RAVV	1	1	100%	
1988	Koltsovo, Soviet Union		1	1	100%	Laboratory accident
1990	Koltsovo, Soviet Union	MARV	1	1	100%	Laboratory accident
1998–2000	Durba and Watsa, Democratic Republic of the Congo	MARV & RAVV	154	128	83%	Two different marburgviruses, MARV and Ravn virus (RAVV), cocirculated and caused disease. The number of cases and deaths due to MARV or RAVV infection have not been reported.
2004–2005	Angola	MARV	374	329	90%	
2007	Uganda	MARV & RAVV	4	1	25%	
2008	Uganda and The Netherlands	MARV	1	1	100%	
2012	Uganda	MARV	18	9	50%	
2014	Uganda	MARV	1	1	100%	
2017	Uganda	MARV	3	3	100%	
2021	Guinea	MARV	1	1	100%	The Guinean government detected the case from a sample of patients who died on August 2, 2021, in the southern prefecture of Gueckedou near the country's borders with Sierra Leone and Liberia.
2022	Ghana	MARV	4	3	75%	Four cases have been reported so far with preparations for a possible outbreak being made. On 17 July 2022, two cases were confirmed by Ghana, with two more being subsequently confirmed on 27 July 2022. See Ghana Marburg virus outbreak 2022.
February 2023	Equatorial Guinea		25	11	44%	See 2023 Marburg virus disease outbreak in Equatorial Guinea.
March 2023	Tanzania		9	6	67%	See 2023 Marburg virus disease outbreak in Tanzania.
2024	Rwanda		58	13	22%	See Rwanda Marburg virus disease outbreak.
2025	Tanzania		1	8 (suspected)		One case confirmed, 24 suspected cases tested negative, 8 suspected cases no cause given (2025-01-21)
November 2025	Ethiopia	MARV	14	9		Fourteen cases and nine fatalities were recorded in Jinka from November 2025 until January 2026.

== Prevention ==
=== Infection prevention and control ===
The Marburg virus is transmitted through the exchange of bodily fluids and through smear infection or contact infection. Virus particles remain infectious in clotted blood for a period of 4–5 days. In convalescent patients, the virus can remain in a pathogenic form in certain parts of the body, particularly in immunologically privileged sites such as the anterior chamber of the eye and in seminal fluid, where it can still be recovered several months after the acute infection has subsided. Survivors of Marburg virus infection should be advised and provided with condoms. As with many similar viruses, viral transmission can be reduced by taking suitable infection prevention and control measures, such as effective identification, cleaning, case isolation, contact tracing and monitoring, using protective clothing, perform safe waste disposal and safe funeral practices for those killed by the disease.

=== Vaccination ===
The first clinical study testing the efficacy of a Marburg virus vaccine was conducted in 2014. The study tested a DNA vaccine and concluded that individuals inoculated with the vaccine exhibited some level of antibodies. However, these vaccines were not expected to provide definitive immunity. Several animal models have been shown to be effective in the research of Marburg virus, such as hamsters, mice, and non-human primates (NHPs). Mice are useful in the initial phases of vaccine development as they are ample models for mammalian disease, but their immune systems are still different enough from humans to warrant trials with other mammals. Of these models, the infection in macaques seems to be the most similar to the effects in humans. A variety of other vaccines have been considered. Virus replicon particles (VRPs) were shown to be effective in guinea pigs, but lost efficacy once tested on NHPs. Additionally, an inactivated virus vaccine proved ineffective. DNA vaccines showed some efficacy in NHPs, but all inoculated individuals showed signs of infection.

Because Marburg virus and Ebola virus belong to the same family, Filoviridae, some scientists have attempted to create a single-injection vaccine for both viruses. This would both make the vaccine more practical and lower the cost for developing countries. Using a single-injection vaccine has been shown to not cause any adverse reactogenicity, which is the possible immune response to vaccination, in comparison to two separate vaccinations.

There is a candidate vaccine against the Marburg virus called rVSV-MARV. It was developed alongside vaccines for closely-related Ebolaviruses by the Canadian government in the early 2000s, twenty years before the outbreak. Production and testing of rVSV-MARV is blocked by legal monopolies held by the Merck Group. Merck acquired rights to all the closely related candidate vaccines in 2014, but declined to work on most of them, including the Marburg vaccine, for economic reasons. While Merck returned the rights to the abandoned vaccines to the Public Health Agency of Canada, the vital rVSV vaccine production techniques which Merck had gained (while bringing the closely related rVSV-ZEBOV vaccine into commercial use in 2019, with GAVI funding) remain Merck's, and cannot be used by anyone else wishing to develop a rVSV vaccine.

As of June 23, 2022, researchers working with the Public Health Agency of Canada conducted a study which showed promising results of a recombinant vesicular stomatitis virus (rVSV) vaccine in guinea pigs, entitled PHV01. According to the study, inoculation with the vaccine approximately one month prior to infection with the virus provided a high level of protection.

Even though there is much experimental research on Marburg virus, there is still no prominent vaccine. Human vaccination trials are either ultimately unsuccessful or are missing data specifically regarding Marburg virus. Due to the cost needed to handle Marburg virus at qualified facilities, the relatively few number of fatalities, and lack of commercial interest, the possibility of a vaccine has simply not come to fruition (see also economics of vaccines).

== Biological weapon ==
The Soviet Union had an extensive offensive and defensive biological weapons program that included MARV. At least three Soviet research institutes had MARV research programs during the Cold War: The Virology Center of the Scientific Research Institute for Microbiology in Zagorsk (today Sergiev Posad), the Scientific-Production Association "Vektor" (today the State Research Center of Virology and Biotechnology "Vektor") in Koltsovo, and the Irkutsk Scientific-Research Anti-Plague Institute of Siberia and the Far East in Irkutsk.

As most performed research was highly classified, it remains unclear how successful the MARV program was. However, Soviet defector Ken Alibek claimed that a weapon filled with MARV was tested at the Stepnogorsk Scientific Experimental and Production Base in Stepnogorsk, Kazakh Soviet Socialist Republic (today Kazakhstan), suggesting that the development of a MARV biological weapon had reached advanced stages. Independent confirmation of this claim is lacking. At least one laboratory accident with MARV, resulting in the death of Koltsovo researcher Nikolai Ustinov, occurred during the Cold War in the Soviet Union and was first described in detail by Alibek.

MARV is a select agent under US law.
