= International Committee on Taxonomy of Viruses =

International organisation that regulates classification and nomenclature of viruses

- Official logo
- Abbreviation: ICTV
- Formation: 1966; 60 years ago
- Purpose: Regulation of taxonomy of viruses
- Fields: Taxonomy; Virology
- President (2020–2023): Murilo Zerbini
- Vice-President (2020–2023): Stuart Siddell
- Parent organization: International Union of Microbiological Societies, Virology Division
- Affiliations: Microbiology Society; Wellcome
- Website: ictv.global

The International Committee on Taxonomy of Viruses (ICTV) authorizes and organizes the taxonomic classification of and the nomenclature for viruses. The ICTV develops a universal taxonomic scheme for viruses, and thus has the means to appropriately describe, name, and classify every virus taxon. The members of the International Committee on Taxonomy of Viruses are considered expert virologists. The ICTV was formed from and is governed by the Virology Division of the International Union of Microbiological Societies. Detailed work, such as identifying new taxa and delimiting the boundaries of species, genera, families, etc. typically is performed by study groups of experts in the families.

== History ==
The International Committee on Nomenclature of Viruses (ICNV) was established in 1966, at the International Congress for Microbiology in Moscow, to standardize the naming of virus taxa. The ICVN published its first report in 1971. For viruses infecting vertebrates, the first report included 19 genera, 2 families, and a further 24 unclassified groups.

The ICNV was renamed the International Committee on Taxonomy of Viruses in 1974.

== Organisational structure ==
The organisation is divided into an executive committee, which includes members and executives with fixed-term elected roles, as well as directly appointed heads of seven subcommittees. Each subcommittee head, in turn, appoints numerous 'study groups', which each consist of one chair and a variable number of members dedicated to the taxonomy of a specific taxon, such as an order or family. This structure may be visualised as follows:

Executive committee

- President
- Vice-president
- Secretaries
  - Business Secretary
  - Proposals Secretary
  - Data Secretary
- Chairs – positions: 7 (one for each subcommittee)
- Elected members – positions: 11

Subcommittees

- Animal DNA Viruses and Retroviruses Subcommittee – study groups: 18
- Animal dsRNA and ssRNA- Viruses Subcommittee – study groups: 24
- Animal ssRNA+ Viruses Subcommittee – study groups: 16
- Bacterial Viruses Subcommittee – study groups: 20
- Archaeal Viruses Subcommittee – study groups: 11
- Fungal and Protist Viruses Subcommittee – study groups: 12
- Plant Viruses Subcommittee – study groups: 22

== Objectives ==
The objectives of the International Committee on Taxonomy of Viruses are:

1. To develop an internationally agreed taxonomy for viruses.
2. To establish internationally agreed names for virus taxa.
3. To communicate the decisions reached concerning the classification and nomenclature of viruses to virologists by holding meetings and publishing reports.
4. To maintain an official index of agreed names of virus taxa.
5. To study the virus effects in modern society and their behaviour.

== Principles of nomenclature ==
The ICTV's essential principles of virus nomenclature are:

- Stability
- To avoid or reject the use of names which might cause error or confusion
- To avoid the unnecessary creation of names

The ICTV's universal virus classification system uses a slightly modified version of the standard biological classification system. It only recognises the taxa order, family, subfamily, genus, and species. When it is uncertain how to classify a species into a genus but its classification in a family is clear, it will be classified as an unassigned species of that family. Many taxa remain unranked. There are also, in GenBank sequences assigned to 3,142 "species" which are not accounted for in the ICTV report (due to the way GenBank works, however, the actual number of proper species is probably significantly smaller). The number of unidentified virus sequences is only expected to increase as the rate of virus sequencing increases dramatically. In 2017, the ICTV endorsed a proposal to adapt the classification of viruses in order to keep up better with the growth of available sequences.

The ICTV has been strikingly successful in achieving stability, since their inception in 1962. Every genus and family recognized in the 1980s continued to be in use as of 2005, for example.

== Naming and changing taxa ==
Proposals for new names, name changes, and the establishment and taxonomic placement of taxa are handled by the executive committee of the ICTV in the form of proposals. All relevant ICTV subcommittees and study groups are consulted prior to a decision being taken.

The name of a taxon has no official status until it has been approved by ICTV, and names will only be accepted if they are linked to approved hierarchical taxa. If no suitable name is proposed for a taxon, the taxon may be approved and the name be left undecided until the adoption of an acceptable international name, when one is proposed to and accepted by ICTV. Names must not convey a meaning for the taxon which would seem to either exclude viruses which are rightfully members of that taxon, exclude members which might one day belong to that taxon, or include viruses which are members of different taxa.

There is no principle of priority for virology, so that a name in current use cannot be invalidated by claiming priority.

== Rules for taxa ==
=== Species ===
Since 2020, the Viral Code requires the use of binomial names for new species: a genus followed by a specific epithet. A species name must provide an appropriately unambiguous identification of the species.

Before then, a more liberal naming system was in effect: a species name shall consist of as few words as practicable but must not consist only of a host name and the word virus. Numbers, letters, or combinations thereof may be used as species epithets where such numbers and letters are already widely used. However, newly designated serial numbers, letters or combinations thereof are not acceptable alone as species epithets. If a number or letter series is in existence it may be continued.

=== Genera ===
A virus genus is a group of related species that share some significant properties and often only differ in host range and virulence. A genus name must be a single word ending in the suffix -virus. Approval of a new genus must be accompanied by the approval of a type species.

=== Subfamilies ===
A subfamily is a group of genera sharing certain common characters. The taxon shall be used only when it is needed to solve a complex hierarchical problem. A subfamily name must be a single word ending in the suffix -virinae.

=== Families ===
A family is a group of genera, whether or not these are organized into subfamilies, sharing certain common characters with each other. A family name must be a single word ending in the suffix -viridae.

=== Orders ===
An order is a group of families sharing certain common characters. An order name must be a single word ending in the suffix -virales.

== Rules for sub-viral agents ==
Rules concerned with the classification of viruses shall also apply to the classification of viroids. The formal endings for taxa of viroids are the word viroid for species, the suffix -viroid for genera, the suffix -viroinae for sub-families, should this taxon be needed, and -viroidae for families. A similar system is in use for satellites and viriforms, substituting -vir- in normal taxa endings with -satellit- and -viriform-.

Retrotransposons are considered to be viruses in classification and nomenclature. Prions are not classified as viruses but are assigned an arbitrary classification as seems useful to workers in the particular fields.

== Rules for orthography ==
1. In formal taxonomic usage the accepted names of virus orders, families, subfamilies, and genera are printed in italics and the first letters of the names are capitalized.
2. Species names are printed in italics and have the first letter of the first word capitalized. Other words are not capitalized unless they are proper nouns, or parts of proper nouns.
3. In formal usage, the name of the taxon shall precede the term for the taxonomic unit.

== Classification of viruses discovered by metagenomics ==
Acknowledging the importance of viral metagenomics, the ICTV recognizes that genomes assembled from metagenomic data represent actual viruses and encourages their official classification following the same procedures as those used for viruses isolated and characterized using classical virology approaches.

== ICTV reports ==
The ICTV has published reports of virus taxonomy about twice a decade since 1971 (listed below - "Reports"). The ninth ICTV report was published in December 2011; the content is now freely available through the ICTV website. Beginning in 2017, the tenth ICTV report was published online on the ICTV website and is free to access with individual chapters updated on a rolling basis. The 2018 and onward taxonomy is available online, including a downloadable Excel spreadsheet of all recognized species.

== ICTVdb database ==
ICTVdb is a species and isolate database that has been intended to serve as a companion to the ICTV taxonomy database. The development of ICTVdB has been supported by the ICTV since 1991 and was initially intended to aid taxonomic research. The database classifies viruses based primarily on their chemical characteristics, genomic type, nucleic acid replication, diseases, vectors, and geographical distribution, among other characteristics.

The database was developed at the Australian National University with support of the US National Science Foundation, and sponsored by the American Type Culture Collection. It uses the Description Language for Taxonomy (DELTA) system, a world standard for taxonomic data exchange, developed at Australia's Commonwealth Scientific and Industrial Research Organisation (CSIRO). DELTA is able to store a wide diversity of data and translate it into a language suitable for traditional reports and web publication. For example, ICTVdB does not itself contain genomic sequence information but can convert DELTA data into NEXUS format. It can also handle large data inputs and is suited to compiling long lists of virus properties, text comments, and images.

ICTVdB has grown in concept and capability to become a major reference resource and research tool; in 1999 it was receiving over 30,000 combined online hits per day from its main site at the Australian National University, and two mirror sites based in the UK and United States.

In 2011, the ICTV decided to suspend the ICTVdb project and web site. This decision was made after it became apparent that the taxonomy provided on the site was many years out of date, and that some of the information on the site was inaccurate due to problems with how the database was being queried and processed to support the natural language output of the ICTVdb web site. The ICTV has begun discussions on how best to fix these problems, but decided that the time frame for updates and error correction were sufficiently long that it was best to take the site down rather than perpetuate the release of inaccurate information. As of August 2013, the database remains on hold. According to some views, "ICTV should also promote the use of a public database to replace the ICTV database as a store of the primary metadata of individual viruses, and should publish abstracts of the ICTV Reports in that database, so that they are 'Open Access'." The database was revived in 2017.

== Reports ==
- Viruses, International Committee on Nomenclature of; Wildy, Peter (1971). Classification and nomenclature of viruses. 1st report. "Out of print"
- Viruses, International Committee on Taxonomy of; Fenner, Frank (1976). Classification and nomenclature of viruses. 2nd report. ISBN 978-3805524186.
- Viruses, International Committee on Taxonomy of; Matthews, Richard Ellis Ford; Section On Virology, International Association of Microbiological Societies (1979). Classification and nomenclature of viruses. 3rd report. ISBN 978-3805505239.
- Ellis, Richard; Matthews, Ford, eds. (1982). Classification and nomenclature of viruses. 4th report. Karger. p. 199. ISBN 9783805535571.
- Viruses, International Committee on Taxonomy of; Francki, R. I. B (1991). Classification and nomenclature of viruses. 5th report. ISBN 978-3211822869.
- Murphy, Frederik A (1995). Virus taxonomy: classification and nomenclature of viruses. 6th report. ISBN 978-3211825945.
- Viruses, International Committee On Taxonomy Of; Van Regenmortel, M. H. V; Fauquet, C. M; Bishop, D. H. L (2000). Virus taxonomy: classification and nomenclature of viruses. 7th report. ISBN 978-0123702005.
- Fauquet, C.M., ed. (2005). Virus taxonomy: classification and nomenclature of viruses. 8th report. Elsevier/Academic Press. ISBN 978-0080575483.
- King, Andrew M. Q.; Lefkowitz, Elliot; Adams, Michael J.; et al., eds. (2011). Virus taxonomy: classification and nomenclature of viruses. 9th report. Elsevier/Academic Press. p. 1338. ISBN 9780123846846. Also available online.
- ICTV 10th (online) Report

== See also ==
- Glossary of scientific naming
- Virus classification
  - International Code of Virus Classification and Nomenclature
- Bioinformatics
