= 2018 DRC Ebola virus outbreak =

2018 DRC Ebola virus outbreak could mean:

- 2018 Équateur province Ebola outbreak
- 2018 Kivu Ebola outbreak
