= 2018 Democratic Republic of the Congo Ebola virus outbreaks =

The 2018 Democratic Republic of the Congo Ebola virus outbreaks are instances where an outbreak of the Ebola virus has occurred in parts of the Democratic Republic of the Congo. These include:

- 2018 Équateur province Democratic Republic of the Congo Ebola virus outbreak
- 2018 Kivu Democratic Republic of the Congo Ebola virus outbreak
