= 2018 Équateur Province Ebola outbreak =

Disease outbreak in the Democratic Republic of the Congo

Coordinates: 0°45′S 18°07′E

- Initial case: 8 May 2018; Declared over: 24 July 2018
- Location of the Province of Équateur in the Democratic Republic of the Congo

- Location of the Democratic Republic of the Congo in Africa
- Confirmed cases: 38
- Probable cases: 16
- Deaths: 33

The 2018 Équateur Province Ebola outbreak occurred in the north-west of the Democratic Republic of the Congo (DRC) from May to July 2018. It was contained entirely within Équateur Province, and was the first time that vaccination with the rVSV-ZEBOV Ebola vaccine had been attempted in the early stages of an Ebola outbreak, with a total of 3,481 people vaccinated. It was the ninth recorded Ebola outbreak in the DRC.

The outbreak began on 8 May 2018, when it was reported that 17 people were suspected of having died from EVD near the town of Bikoro in the Province of Équateur. The World Health Organization declared the outbreak after two people were confirmed as having the disease. On 17 May, the virus was confirmed to have spread to the inland port city of Mbandaka, causing the WHO to raise its assessment of the national risk level to "very high", but not yet to constitute an international public health emergency. The WHO declared the outbreak over on 24 July 2018, with 33 confirmed deaths.

Subsequent to the end of this outbreak, the Kivu Ebola epidemic commenced in the eastern region of the country on 1 August 2018; it was declared over on 25 June 2020 with 2,280 deaths recorded. A further separate outbreak in the Province of Équateur was announced on 1 June 2020 by the Congolese health ministry, described as the eleventh Ebola outbreak since records began. This eleventh outbreak was declared over as of 18 November following no reported cases for 42 days, having caused 130 cases and 55 deaths.

== Epidemiology ==
=== Early cases ===
Location of suspected cases reported

The earliest cases are believed to have occurred in early April 2018. The suspected index case was a police officer, who died in a health center in the village of Ikoko-Impenge, near the market town of Bikoro in Équateur province, according to the International Federation of the Red Cross and Red Crescent Societies.

After his funeral, eleven family members became ill, and seven of them died. All of the seven deceased had attended the man's funeral or cared for him while he was sick. The identification of this individual as the index case has not yet been confirmed.

Équateur province's Provincial Health Division reported 21 cases with symptoms consistent with Ebola virus disease, of whom 17 had died, on 3 May 2018. Of these, eight cases were subsequently shown not to have been Ebola-related. The outbreak was declared on 8 May after samples from two of five patients in Bikoro tested positive for the Zaire strain of the Ebola virus.

On 10 May, the World Health Organization (WHO) stated that the Democratic Republic of the Congo had a total of 32 cases of EVD, and a further two suspected cases were announced on the following day, bringing the total cases to 34, all located in the Bikoro area of DRC.

Timeline of reported cases and deaths
Date	Cases				Deaths	CFR	Contacts
Date	Confirmed	Probable	Suspected	Total	Deaths	CFR	Contacts
2018-05-11	2	18	14	34	18	52.9%	75
2018-05-14	2	22	17	41	20	48.8%	432
2018-05-18	14	21	10	45	25	55.6%	532
2018-05-20	28	21	2	51	27	52.9%	628
2018-05-23	31	13	8	52	22^{*}	42.3%	>600
2018-05-27	35	13	6	54	25	46.3%	906
2018-05-30	37	13	0	50^{*}	25	50%	>900
2018-06-03	37	13	6	56	25	44.6%	880
2018-06-06	38	14	10	62	27	43.6%	619
2018-06-10	38	14	3	55^{*}	28	50.9%	634
2018-06-17	38	14	10	62	28	45.1%	289
2018-06-20	38	14	9	61^{*}	28	45.9%	179
2018-06-24	38	14	3	55^{*}	28	51%	179
2018-06-29	38	15	0	53^{*}	29	54.7%	0
2018-07-09	38	15	0	53	29	54.7%	0
2018-07-24	38	16	0	54	33	61%	0
^{*} numbers are subject to revision both up, when new cases are discovered, and down, when tests show cases were not Ebola-related.

=== Spread to Mbandaka ===
In the eight previous Ebola outbreaks in DRC since 1976, the virus had never before reached a major city. In May 2018, for the first time, four cases were confirmed in the city of Mbandaka.

On 14 May, suspected cases were reported in the Iboko and Wangata areas in Équateur province, in addition to Bikoro. The WHO reported on 17 May 2018 that the first case of this outbreak in an urban area had been confirmed in the Wangata district of Mbandaka city, the capital of Équateur province, about 100 miles north of Bikoro. Mbandaka is a busy, densely populated port on the Congo River with a population of 1.2 million, leading to a high risk of contagion. The following day, the WHO raised the health risk in DRC to "very high" due to the presence of the virus in an urban area.

The DRC government was particularly concerned about the virus spreading by boat transport along the Congo between Mbandaka and the capital, Kinshasa. The WHO also considered that there was a high risk of the outbreak spreading to nine other countries in the region, including the bordering Republic of the Congo and Central African Republic.

As of 23 May 2018, the focus of the outbreak was split between Bikoro and Iboko; Iboko had 55% of the confirmed cases of EVD and Bikoro had 81.5% of the fatalities. The cases in the Bikoro health zone were located in Ikoko Impenge (12), Bikoro (6), Momboyo (1) and Moheli (1); those in the Iboko health zone were located in Itipo (13), Mpangi (2), Wenga (1) and Loongo (1).

According to the fifth situation report released by the WHO, the case fatality rate (CFR) was 42.3%. Demographics had been reported for 44 cases as of 22 May; there were 26 cases of EVD in men and 18 in women; 7 cases were in children 14 years and under, and 9 were in those over 60 years. By 23 May, there had been 5 reported cases in health-care workers, including two who died. Contact tracing was being employed to identify contacts with infected individuals. On 29 May, it was reported that 800 contacts had been identified in the city of Mbandaka; the next day it was reported that 500 people in the city had been vaccinated.

Cases and deaths by health zone As of 24 July 2018
Health zone	Cases				Deaths	CFR
Health zone	Confirmed	Probable	Suspected	Total	Deaths	CFR
Bikoro	10	11	0	21	18	85.7%
Iboko	24	5	0	29	12	41.3%
Wangata	4	0	0	4	3	75%
Ingende	0	0	0	0	0	-
Total	38	16	0	54	33	61%

On 29 May, the WHO indicated that nine neighbouring countries had been alerted for being at high risk of spread of EVD, On 4 June, it was reported that Angola had closed its border with the DRC due to the outbreak.

=== End of the outbreak ===
This outbreak in the Democratic Republic of the Congo was declared over on 24 July 2018 after 42 days passed without any new confirmed cases. Although it was noted that a new outbreak occurred only one week later in the eastern region of Kivu; and it has been established that they are not linked.

== Containment challenges ==
The Bikoro area had three hospitals, but the area's health services were described by WHO as predominantly having "limited functionality"; they received supplies from international bodies but experienced frequent shortages. More than half of the Bikoro area cases were in Ikoko-Impenge, a village not connected to the road system. Bikoro lies in dense rain forest, and the area's remoteness and inadequate infrastructure hindered treatment of EVD patients, as well as surveillance and vaccination efforts.

Adherence was another challenge: on 20–21 May, three individuals with EVD in an isolation ward of a treatment center in Mbandaka fled; two later died after attending a prayer meeting, at which they may have exposed 50 other attendees to the virus. Bushmeat was believed to be one vector of infection, but bushmeat vendors at the Mbandaka market told reporters that they did not believe Ebola was real or serious. Hostility towards health workers trying to offer medical assistance was also reported. On 29 May, the WHO forecast that there would be 100–300 cases by the end of July.

== Virology ==
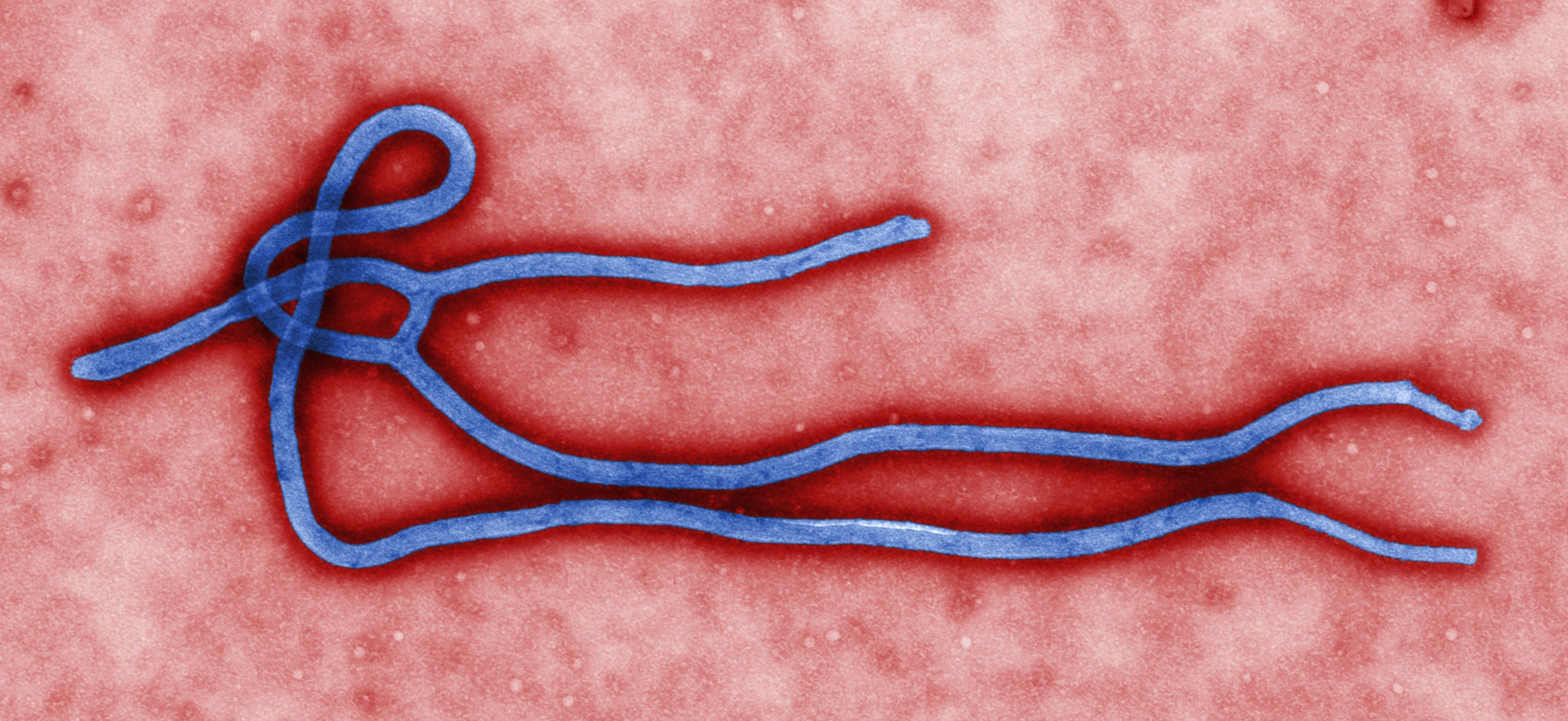
Ebola virus virion

Zaire ebolavirus, which was identified in this outbreak, is included in genus Ebolavirus, family Filoviridae,

The virus was named for the Ebola River, which runs as a tributary of the Congo River in the Democratic Republic of the Congo; the Zaire strain was first identified in 1976 in Yambuku.

== Response ==
Médecins Sans Frontières (MSF) established treatment centers in Bikoro, Ikoko and Wangata. WHO sent an expert team to Bikoro on 8 May, and on 13 May, WHO Director-General Tedros Adhanom Ghebreyesus visited the town. On 18 May, the WHO IHR committee met and decided against declaring a Public Health Emergency of International Concern. As of 24 May 2018, WHO had sent 138 technical personnel to the three affected areas; the Red Cross sent more than 150 people, and UNICEF personnel were also active. Other international agencies sending teams included the UK Public Health Rapid Support Team and the Africa Centres for Disease Control and Prevention. The Wellcome Trust donated £2 million towards the DRC outbreak. Merck donated its experimental vaccine and the GAVI international vaccination alliance helped to support vaccination operations. Several tons of supplies were shipped to the DRC, including protection and disinfection kits and palliative drugs. After the virus spread to the city of Mbandaka, DRC health minister Oly Ilunga Kalenga announced that healthcare would be provided free for those affected.

US President Donald Trump has advocated rescinding Ebola funding and most financing for State Department emergency responses. National Security Advisor John Bolton removed the National Security Council's health security chief on the day that the Ebola outbreak was declared, shutting down the entire epidemic prevention office. The U.S. Centers for Disease Control and Prevention says "about five" of its staff advise the Congolese government. CDC presence appears to be smaller than West African countries'. The U.S. Agency for International Development promised $1 million to WHO for Ebola efforts. Germany has promised $5.8 million.

=== Surveillance ===
Surveillance of travelers at Mbandaka's port and airport was performed. The DRC Ministry of Public Health identified 115 areas where movement of people increased the risk of virus transmission, including 83 river ports, nine airports and seven bus stations, as well as 16 markets. José Makila, the DRC minister of transport, stated that the Navy would be used to surveil river traffic on the Congo. On 10 May, the Nigerian Ministry of Health reported it would start screening at its borders, and on 18 May 2018, a total of 20 countries had instituted screening of travelers coming from the DRC. WHO sent teams to 8/9 of the neighboring countries to assess their capability to deal with EVD spread and facilitate their surveillance. The DRC Ministry of Public Health worked with surveyors and cartographers from UCLA and OpenStreetMap DRC to improve mapping of the affected area. A laboratory commenced operations in Bikoro on 16 May, enabling local testing of patient samples for Ebola virus.

Burials were organized by MSF and the Red Cross of the Democratic Republic of the Congo to minimize the risk of transmission. The United Nations Radio broadcast EVD awareness information, and posters and leaflets were prepared and distributed. UNICEF warned 143 churches across Mbandaka of the risks of prayer meetings.

== Treatment ==
=== Ring vaccination with rVSV-ZEBOV ===
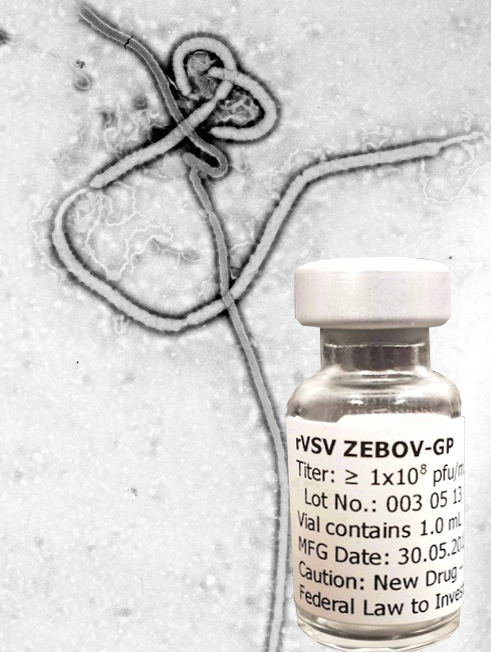
ZEBOV

Ebola and contact tracing

Health authorities including DRC's Ministry of Public Health used recombinant vesicular stomatitis virus–Zaire Ebola virus (rVSV-ZEBOV) vaccine – a recently developed experimental Ebola vaccine, produced by Merck – to try to suppress the outbreak. This live-attenuated vaccine expresses the surface glycoprotein of the Kikwit 1995 strain of Zaire ebolavirus in a recombinant vesicular stomatitis virus vector. rVSV-ZEBOV was trialed in Guinea and Sierra Leone during the West African epidemic of 2013–16, with 5837 people receiving the vaccine; the trial authors concluded that rVSV-ZEBOV provided "substantial protection" against EVD, but subsequent commentators have questioned the degree of protection obtained and the degree of long-term protection conferred is unknown. As the vaccine had not been approved by any regulatory authority, it was used in DRC under a compassionate use trial protocol.

A ring vaccination strategy was used, which involves vaccinating only those most likely to be infected: direct contacts of infected individuals, and contacts of those contacts. Other groups targeted included health workers, laboratory personnel, surveillance workers and people involved with burials. People who were vaccinated were followed up for 84 days to assess whether they were protected from infection and to monitor any adverse events. A total of 4,320 doses of the rVSV-ZEBOV vaccine were delivered to DRC's capital Kinshasa by WHO on 16 May, and a further 3,240 doses arrived three days later; with another 8,000 doses to be made available. The vaccine must be transported and stored at between −60 and −80 °C. A cold chain was established in Kinshasa by 18 May and has been extended to Mbandaka. WHO planned to concentrate on vaccinating three sets of contacts of confirmed EVD cases, two in Bikoro and one in Mbandaka.

Ring vaccination strategy

Vaccination started on 21 May among health workers in Mbandaka, with 7,560 vaccine doses ready for immediate use, according to WHO. The DRC health minister Oly Ilunga Kalenga stated that vaccination of health workers and Ebola case contacts in the Wangata and Bolenge areas of Mbandaka would take five days, after which vaccination would start in Bikoro and Iboko. As of 24 May 2018, 154 people in Mbandaka had been vaccinated, and preparations were started for vaccinating in Bikoro and Iboko. Up to 1,000 people were expected to have been vaccinated by 26 May, according to WHO. It was the first time that vaccination had been attempted in the early stages of an Ebola outbreak.

The rVSV-ZEBOV vaccine proved effective for the strain of the Ebola virus in this outbreak, having via ring vaccination protected some 3,481 individuals.

=== Experimental therapeutic agents ===
Chemical formula of favipiravir

Health officials considered trialing experimental treatments, including the antiviral agents favipiravir and GS-5734, and the antibody ZMapp. All three agents were given to patients during the West African epidemic, but none has yet been proved to be effective. The DRC Ministry of Public Health also requested that the US trial mAb114 treatment during the outbreak. The mAb114 monoclonal antibody was developed by the National Institutes of Health and Jean-Jacques Muyembe at the National Institute for Biomedical Research, and is derived from an EVD survivor of the 1995 Kikwit outbreak who still had circulating anti-Ebola antibodies eleven years later; it has been tested in macaques but not in humans.

The ZMapp cocktail was assessed by the World Health Organization for emergency use under the MEURI ethical protocol. The panel agreed that "the benefits of ZMapp outweigh its risks" while noting that it presented logistical challenges, particularly that of requiring a cold chain for distribution and storage. Despite being at earlier stages of development, three other therapies, mAb114, remdesivir and REGN3470-3471-3479, were also approved for emergency use under MEURI and the Ministry of Health in the DRC.

== Prognosis ==
Post-Ebola virus syndrome affects those who have survived EVD infection; the resulting signs and symptoms can include muscle pain, eye problems and neurological problems.

== History ==
The Democratic Republic of the Congo (formerly Zaire) has had several previous EVD outbreaks since 1976, which are summarised in the Table below. All have been located in the west or north of the country. Three previous outbreaks (in 1976, 1977 and 2014) occurring in former province of Équateur, of which the current Équateur province forms part.

In 2014, the WHO considered that the DRC was lagging behind the rest of Africa in health expenditures, at the relative rate of Intl$32 per head.

For the 2017 Democratic Republic of the Congo Ebola virus outbreak, the DRC regulatory authorities approved the use of the experimental rVSV-ZEBOV vaccine, but logistical issues delayed its implementation until the outbreak was already under control.

Shortly before the first cases of the 2018 Ebola outbreak, the country experienced a widespread cholera epidemic (June 2017 – spring 2018), which was the most serious in the country since 1994.

Timeline of Ebola outbreaks in the Democratic Republic of the Congo (formerly Zaire) since 1976
^{V}^{・}^{T} Date	Country	Major location	Outbreak information				Source
^{V}^{・}^{T} Date	Country	Major location	Strain	Cases	Deaths	CFR	Source
Aug 1976	Zaire	Yambuku	EBOV	318	280	88%	
Jun 1977	Zaire	Tandala	EBOV	1	1	100%	
May–Jul 1995	Zaire	Kikwit	EBOV	315	254	81%	
Aug–Nov 2007	Democratic Republic of the Congo	Kasai-Occidental	EBOV	264	187	71%	
Dec 2008–Feb 2009	Democratic Republic of the Congo	Kasai-Occidental	EBOV	32	14	45%	
Jun–Nov 2012	Democratic Republic of the Congo	Orientale	BDBV	77	36	47%	
Aug–Nov 2014	Democratic Republic of the Congo	Tshuapa	EBOV	66	49	74%	
May–Jul 2017	Democratic Republic of the Congo	Likati	EBOV	8	4	50%	
Apr–Jul 2018	Democratic Republic of the Congo	Équateur Province	EBOV	54	33	61%	
Aug 2018–June 2020	Democratic Republic of the Congo	Kivu	EBOV	3,470	2,280	66%	
June–Nov 2020	Democratic Republic of the Congo	Équateur Province	EBOV	130	55	42%	
Feb 2021–May 2021	Democratic Republic of the Congo	North Kivu	EBOV	12	6	50%	
April 2022	Democratic Republic of the Congo	Équateur Province	EBOV	5	5	100%	
August 2022	Democratic Republic of the Congo	North Kivu	EBOV	1	1	100%	

== See also ==
- 2017 Democratic Republic of the Congo Ebola virus outbreak
- 2014 Democratic Republic of the Congo Ebola virus outbreak
- West Africa Ebola virus epidemic
- 2018 Kivu Democratic Republic of the Congo Ebola virus outbreak
