= Ikoko-Impenge =

Village in Équateur, Democratic Republic of the Congo

Coordinates: 0.7987°S 18.4471°E

Ikoko-Impenge (also transliterated as Ikoko-Ipenge or Ikoki-Impenge) is a village situated 30 kilometers to the south-east of the market town of Bikoro in the Province of Équateur of the Democratic Republic of the Congo. Although Ikoko-Impenge is accessible by road, it is difficult to reach in the rainy season, and lacks mobile telephone connectivity.

The village is in Ikoko health area. In 2018, a police officer who died in a health centre in Ikoko-Impenge is believed to have been the first known victim of the 2018 Équateur province Democratic Republic of the Congo Ebola virus outbreak.
