= Mapp Biopharmaceutical =

American pharmaceutical company

- Headquarters: San Diego, United States
- Key people: Larry Zeitlin (President); Kevin Whaley (CEO)
- Products: Biopharmaceuticals
- Subsidiaries: LeafBio
- Website: mappbio.com

Mapp Biopharmaceutical is an American pharmaceutical company founded in 2003 by Larry Zeitlin and Kevin Whaley. Mapp Biopharmaceutical is based in San Diego, California. It is responsible for the research and development of ZMapp, a drug which is still under development and comprises three humanized monoclonal antibodies used as a treatment for Ebola virus disease. The drug was first tested in humans during the 2014 West Africa Ebola virus outbreak.

The ZMapp drug is a result of the collaboration between Mapp Biopharmaceutical, LeafBio (the commercial arm of Mapp Biopharmaceutical), Defyrus Inc. (Toronto), the U.S. government, and the Public Health Agency of Canada. The antibody work came out of research projects funded by Defense Advanced Research Projects Agency (DARPA) more than a decade ago, and years of funding by the Public Health Agency of Canada. ZMapp is manufactured in the tobacco plant Nicotiana benthamiana in the bioproduction process known as "pharming" by Kentucky BioProcessing, a subsidiary of Reynolds American.
