= Oly Ilunga Kalenga =

Belgian–Congolese medical doctor (born 1960)

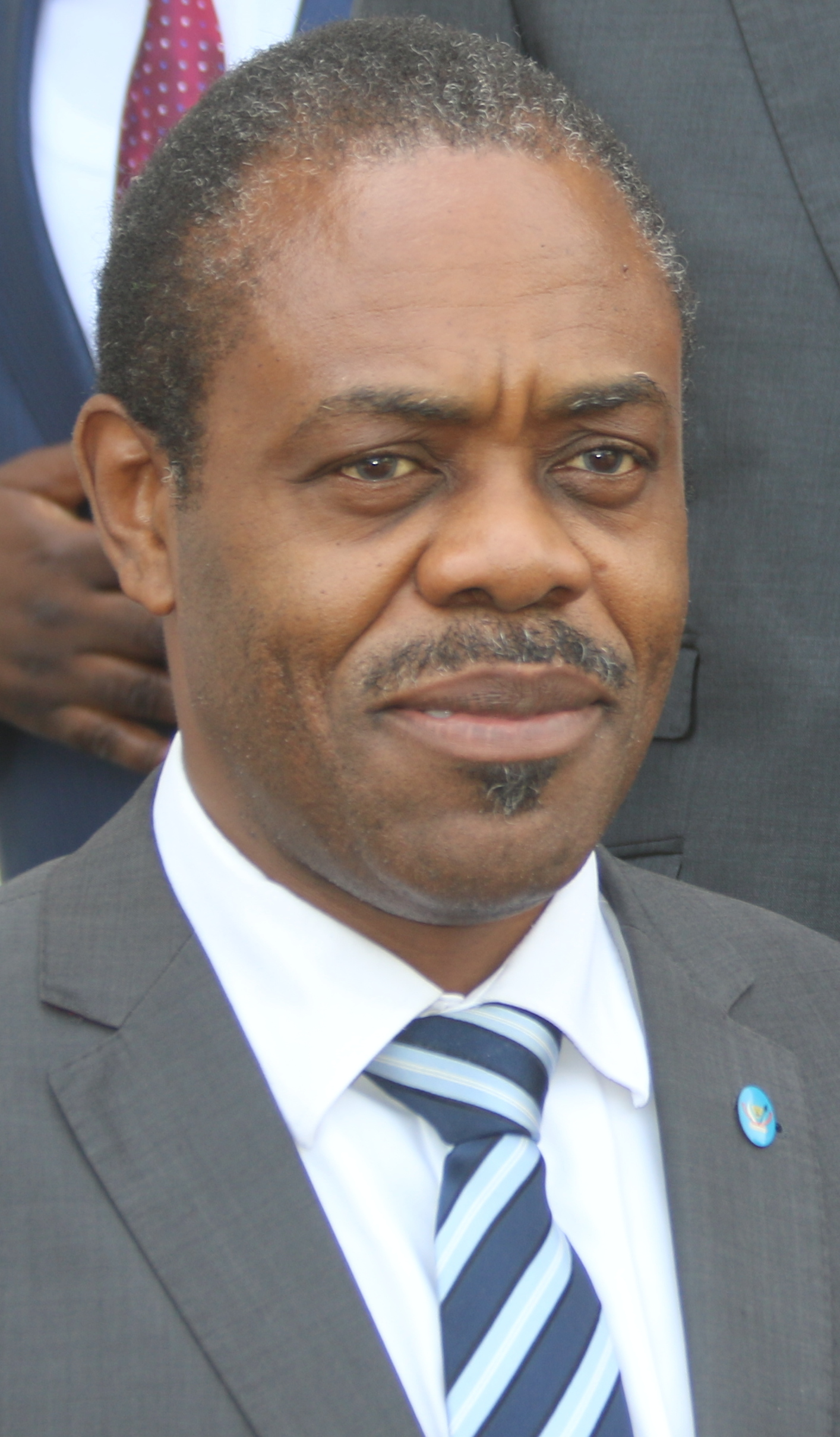
Oly Ilunga Kalenga in 2018

Oly Ilunga Kalenga (born 24 June 1960) is a Belgian–Congolese medical doctor who was the Democratic Republic of the Congo's Minister of Public Health from 2016 to 2019. He resigned his post on 22 July 2019, then was arrested on 14 September 2019 for allegedly mismanaging a portion of Congo's $4.3 million in Ebola response money, an allegation that he denies.

Dr. Oly Ilunga was released from Makala Prison on 9 September 2024 after having fully served his five-year sentence.

In July 2025, the United Nations Human Rights Committee confirmed that his 2020 conviction by the Court of Cassation of the Democratic Republic of Congo, acting as a court of first and final instance, without the possibility of appeal allowing for a review of the conviction and sentence, constituted a violation of his fundamental rights. The Committee considered that, in the case of Dr. Oly Ilunga, an effective remedy would consist in granting him adequate compensation.

== Early life and education ==
Oly Ilunga Kalenga moved to Belgium aged 13. He studied medicine at the UCLouvain. From 1985 to 1986, he obtained a diploma in statistics at Pierre and Marie Curie University, then he obtained a doctorate in public health from UCLouvain in 1990 and a specialization in internal medicine in 1991. He also holds an MBA in management obtained from the Louvain School of Management. His MD was followed by an MBA in public health and epidemiology specialising in health economics at the Louvain School of Management of the UCLouvain in Louvain-la-Neuve.

He worked at the Cliniques de l'Europe (Europe Hospitals) in Brussels, specialising in internal medicine and intensive care, rising to head the intensive care unit, and then became the hospital's medical director and managing director (2013–16).

== Democratic Republic of the Congo ==
Ilunga Kalenga began consulting for the Democratic Republic of the Congo (DRC) health ministry in 2000 and was appointed DRC's Minister of Public Health in December 2016. After two-and-a-half years, on 22 July 2019, Kalenga resigned after his mandate was curtailed to only non-Ebola public-health matters, attributing his departure to the Congolese President Félix Tshisekedi's decision to oversee the DRC's Ebola response personally, and to his desire to avoid "creating confusion" and to avert the "inevitable...predictable [public] outcry" such a sharing of oversight entailed. Tshisekedi then appointed a team of experts, led by Jean-Jacques Muyembe-Tamfum, described by The Lancet as Africa's Ebola hunter, to direct the Congo's Ebola response.

His tenure as public health minister was marked by two outbreaks of Ebola virus disease in the country, in Équateur in May–July 2018 and in Kivu and Ituri from August 2018 (ongoing as of April 2020). Vaccination was key to the successful control of the Équateur outbreak, and Ilunga Kalenga stated that he was vaccinated "to show the vaccine's safety and break the stigma around it."

He also served on the board of the African Constituency Bureau (2018–20).

== Selected publications ==
- Oly Ilunga Kalenga; Matshidiso Moeti; Annie Sparrow; Vinh-Kim Nguyen; Daniel R. Lucey; Tedros A. Ghebreyesus (29 May 2019), "The Ongoing Ebola Epidemic in the Democratic Republic of Congo, 2018–2019", New England Journal of Medicine, 381 (4): 373–383, doi:10.1056/NEJMsr1904253, PMID 31141654
- Oly Ilunga Kalenga (25 July 2018), "We've halted the spread of deadly Ebola in Congo – so what went right?", The Guardian
