= RVSV-ZEBOV vaccine =

Vaccine against Ebola virus disease

rVSV-ZEBOV vaccine
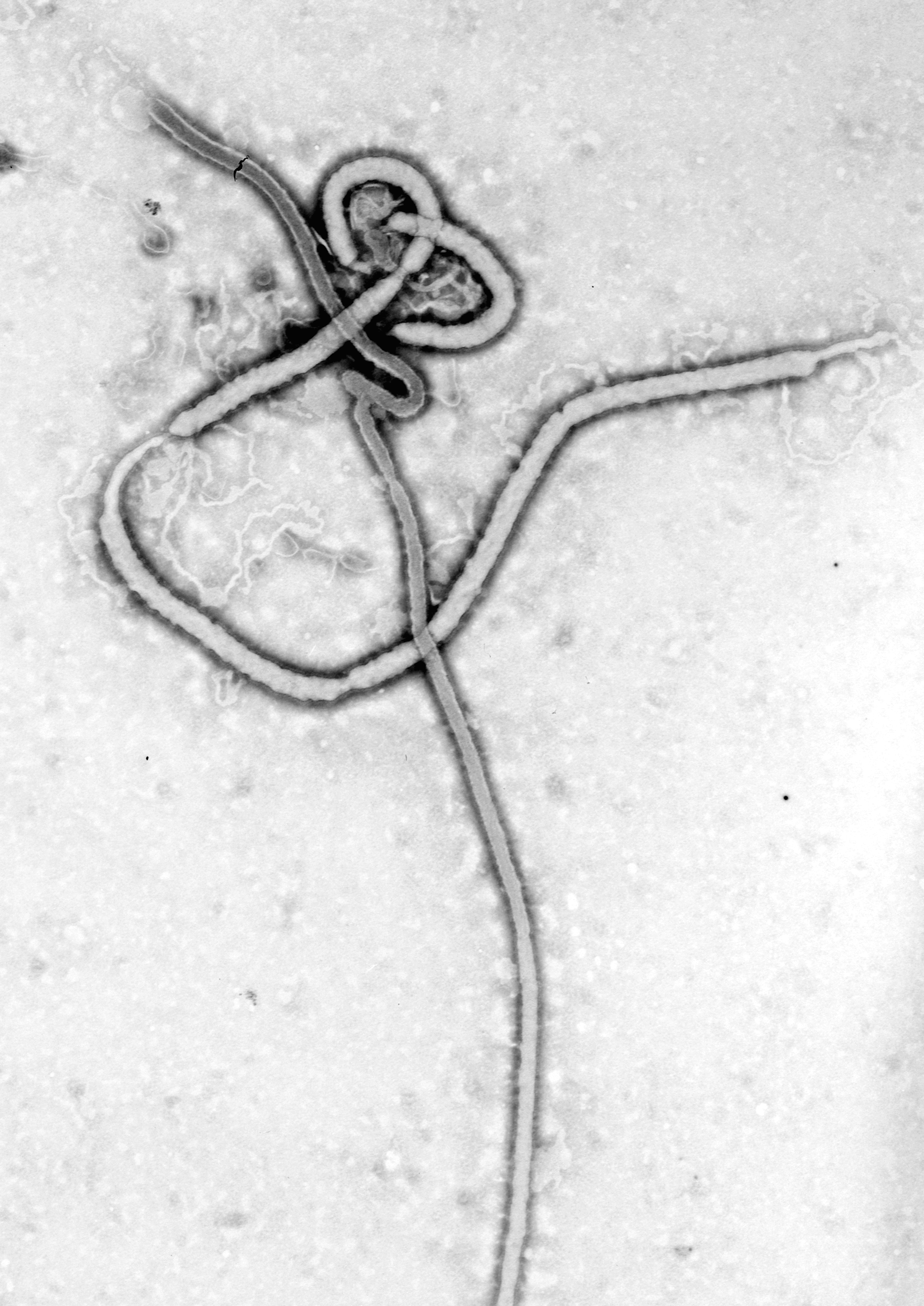
- An electron micrograph of the Ebola virus

Vaccine description
- Target: Ebola virus
- Vaccine type: Recombinant vector

Clinical data
- Trade names: Ervebo
- Other names: V920, rVSVΔG-ZEBOV-GP Ebola vaccine
- AHFS/Drugs.com: Monograph
- License data: EU EMA: by INN; US DailyMed: Ervebo
- Routes of administration: Intramuscular
- ATC code: J07BX02 (WHO)

Legal status
- Legal status: CA: ℞-only / Schedule D; US: ℞-only; EU: Rx-only; In general: ℞ (Prescription only)

Identifiers
- CAS Number: 2581749-86-0
- DrugBank: DB15595
- ChemSpider: none
- UNII: Y9VG7O3KTT

Recombinant vesicular stomatitis virus–Zaire Ebola virus (rVSV-ZEBOV), also known as Ebola Zaire vaccine live and sold under the brand name Ervebo, is an Ebola vaccine for adults that prevents Ebola caused by the Zaire ebolavirus. When used in ring vaccination, rVSV-ZEBOV has shown a high level of protection. Around half the people given the vaccine have mild to moderate adverse effects that include headache, fatigue, and muscle pain.

rVSV-ZEBOV is a recombinant, replication-competent viral vector vaccine. It consists of rice-derived recombinant human serum albumin and live attenuated recombinant vesicular stomatitis virus (VSV), which has been genetically engineered to express the main glycoprotein from the Zaire ebolavirus so as to provoke a neutralizing immune response to the Ebola virus.

The vaccine was approved for medical use in the European Union and the United States in 2019. It was created by scientists at the National Microbiology Laboratory in Winnipeg, Manitoba, Canada, which is part of the Public Health Agency of Canada (PHAC). PHAC licensed it to a small company, Newlink Genetics, which started developing the vaccine; Newlink in turn licensed it to Merck in 2014. It was used in the DR Congo in a 2018 outbreak in Équateur province, and has since been used extensively in the 2018–20 Kivu Ebola outbreak, with over 90,000 people vaccinated.

== Medical use ==
Nearly 800 people were ring vaccinated on an emergency basis with VSV-EBOV when another Ebola outbreak occurred in Guinea in March 2016. In 2017, in the face of a new outbreak of Ebola in the Democratic Republic of the Congo, the Ministry of Health approved the vaccine's emergency use, but it was not immediately deployed.

=== Effectiveness ===
In April 2019, following a large-scale ring-vaccination scheme in the DRC outbreak, the WHO published the preliminary results of its research, in association with the DRC's Institut National pour la Recherche Biomedicale, into the effectiveness of the ring vaccination program, stating that the rVSV-ZEBOV-GP vaccine had been 97.5% effective at stopping Ebola transmission, relative to no vaccination.

== Side effects ==
Systemic side effects include headache, feverishness, fatigue, joint and muscle pain, nausea, arthritis, rash, and abnormal sweating. Injection-site side events include injection-site pain, swelling, and redness.

== Biochemistry ==
rVSV-ZEBOV is a live, attenuated recombinant vesicular stomatitis virus (VSV) in which the gene for the native envelope glycoprotein (P03522) is replaced with that from the Ebola virus (P87666), Kikwit 1995 Zaire strain. Manufacturing of the vaccine for the Phase I trial was done by IDT Biologika. Manufacturing of vaccine for the Phase III trial was done by Merck, using the Vero cell line, which Merck already used to make its RotaTeq vaccine against rotavirus.

== History ==
Area where the West African Ebola virus started and affected nearby countries, in the end causing more than 28,000 cases with about 45% of the total number ending in fatality

Scientists working for the Public Health Agency of Canada (PHAC) created the vaccine, and PHAC applied for a patent in 2003. From 2005, to 2009, three animal trials on the virus were published, all of them funded by the Canadian and U.S. governments. In 2005, a single intramuscular injection of the EBOV or MARV vaccine was found to induce completely protective immune responses in nonhuman primates (crab-eating macaques) against corresponding infections with the otherwise typically lethal EBOV or MARV.

In 2010, PHAC licensed the intellectual property on the vaccine to a small U.S. company called Bioprotection Systems, which was a subsidiary of Newlink Genetics, for US $205,000 and "low single-digit percentage" royalties. Newlink had funding from the U.S. Defense Threat Reduction Agency to develop vaccines.

In December 2013, the largest-ever Ebola epidemic started in West Africa, specifically, in Guinea. On August 12, the WHO ruled that offering people infected with Ebola the RVSV-ZEBOV vaccine (which at the time was untested on humans) was ethical, and the Canadian government donated 500 doses of the vaccine to the WHO. In October 2014, Newlink had no vaccine in production and no human trials underway, and there were calls for the Canadian government to cancel the contract. In September or October 2014, Newlink formed a steering committee among the interested parties, including PHAC, the NIH, and the WHO, to plan the clinical development of the vaccine.

In October 2014, Newlink Genetics began a Phase I clinical trial of rVSV-ZEBOV on healthy human subjects to evaluate the immune response, identify any side effects and determine the appropriate dosage. Phase I trials took place in Gabon, Kenya, Germany, Switzerland, the US, and Canada. In November 2014, Newlink exclusively licensed rights to the vaccine to Merck for US $50 million plus royalties.

The Phase I study started with a high dose which caused arthritis and skin reactions in some people, and the vaccine was found replicating in the synovial fluid of the joints of the affected people; the clinical trial was halted because of that, then recommenced with a lower dose.

In March 2015, a Phase II clinical trial and a Phase III started in Guinea at the same time; the Phase II trial focused on frontline health workers, while the Phase III trial was a ring vaccination in which close contacts of people who had contracted Ebola virus were vaccinated with VSV-EBOV.

In January 2016, the GAVI Alliance signed an agreement with Merck under which Merck agreed to provide VSV-EBOV vaccine for future outbreaks of Ebola and GAVI paid Merck US$5 million; Merck will use the funds to complete clinical trials and obtain regulatory approval. As of that date, Merck had submitted an application to the World Health Organization (WHO) through their Emergency Use Assessment and Listing (EUAL) program to allow for use of the vaccine in the case of another epidemic. It was used on an emergency basis in Guinea in March 2016.

Results of the Phase III Guinea trial were published in December 2016. It was widely reported in the media that vaccine was safe and appeared to be nearly 100% effective, but the vaccine remained unavailable for commercial use as of December 2016.

In April 2017, scientists from the U.S. National Academy of Medicine (NAM) published a review of the response to the Ebola outbreak that included a discussion of how clinical trial candidates were selected, how trials were designed and conducted, and reviewed the data resulting from the trials. The committee found that data from the Phase III Guinea trial were difficult to interpret for several reasons. The trial had no placebo arm; it was omitted for ethical reasons and everyone involved, including the committee, agreed with the decision. This left only a delayed treatment group to serve as a control, but this group was eliminated after an interim analysis showed high levels of protection, which left the trial even more underpowered. The committee found that under an intention-to-treat analysis, the rVSV-ZEBOV vaccine might have had no efficacy, agreed with the authors of the December 2016 report that it probably had some efficacy, but found statements that it had substantial or 100% efficacy to be unsupportable.

In April 2019, following a large-scale ring-vaccination scheme in the DRC outbreak, preliminary results showed that the vaccine had been 97.5% effective at stopping Ebola transmission, relative to no vaccination.

In September 2019, the US Food and Drug Administration (FDA) accepted Merck's Biologics License Application and granted priority review for the vaccine.

In October 2019, the European Medicines Agency (EMA) recommended granting conditional marketing authorization for the rVSV-ZEBOV-GP vaccine.

In November 2019, the European Commission granted a conditional marketing authorization to Ervebo and the World Health Organization (WHO) prequalified an Ebola vaccine for the first time, indicating that the vaccine met WHO standards for quality, safety and efficacy, and allowing UN agencies and GAVI to procure vaccine for distributions.

In December 2019, Ervebo was approved for use in the United States.

The approval of Ervebo was supported by a study conducted in Guinea during the 2014-2016 outbreak in individuals 18 years of age and older. The study was a randomized cluster (ring) vaccination study in which 3,537 contacts, and contacts of contacts, of individuals with laboratory-confirmed Ebola virus disease (EVD) received either "immediate" or 21-day "delayed" vaccination with Ervebo. This noteworthy design was intended to capture a social network of individuals and locations that might include dwellings or workplaces where a patient spent time while symptomatic, or the households of individuals who had contact with the patient during that person's illness or death. In a comparison of cases of EVD among 2,108 individuals in the "immediate" vaccination arm and 1,429 individuals in the "delayed" vaccination arm, Ervebo was determined to be 100% effective in preventing Ebola cases with symptom onset greater than ten days after vaccination. No cases of EVD with symptom onset greater than ten days after vaccination were observed in the "immediate" cluster group, compared with ten cases of EVD in the 21-day "delayed" cluster group.

In additional studies, antibody responses to Ervebo were assessed in 477 individuals in Liberia, approximately 500 individuals in Sierra Leone and approximately 900 individuals in Canada, Spain, and the US. The antibody responses among those in the study conducted in Canada, Spain and the US were similar to those among individuals in the studies conducted in Liberia and Sierra Leone.

The safety of Ervebo was assessed in approximately 15,000 individuals in Africa, Europe and North America. The most commonly reported side effects were pain, swelling and redness at the injection site, as well as headache, fever, joint and muscle aches and fatigue.

The application for Ervebo in the United States was granted priority review, a tropical disease priority review voucher, and breakthrough therapy designation. The US Food and Drug Administration (FDA) granted approval for Ervebo to Merck & Co., Inc.

Merck discontinued development of the related rVSV vaccines for Marburg virus (rVSV-MARV) and Sudan ebolavirus (rVSV-SUDV). Merck returned the rights on these vaccines back to Public Health Agency of Canada. The knowledge on developing rVSV vaccines which Merck gained with GAVI funding remains Merck's, and cannot be used by anyone else wishing to develop a rVSV vaccine.

In July 2023, the FDA expanded the approval of Ervebo for use in people aged 12 months through 17 years of age. Ervebo was approved for use in people aged 18 years of age and older in December 2019.

== Ebola 2018 ==
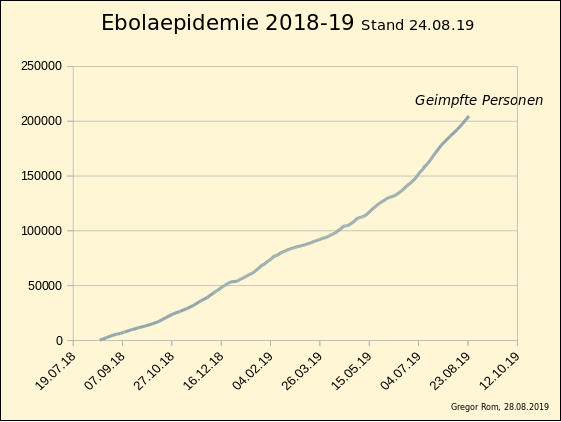
2018 Kivu Ebola outbreak: Number of rVSV-ZEBOV vaccinated persons in the epidemic area DRC

=== 2018 Democratic Republic of the Congo Ebola virus outbreak ===
During an outbreak in the Democratic Republic of the Congo in 2018, the ZEBOV vaccine was used, and what was once contact tracing which numbered 1,706 individuals (ring vaccination which totaled 3,330) was reduced to zero on June 28, 2018. The outbreak completed the required 42-day cycle on July 24.

=== 2018 Kivu Ebola outbreak ===
On August 1, 2018, an EVD outbreak was declared in North Kivu DRC. After six months the current totals stand at 735 total cases and 371 deaths; violence in the region has helped the spread of the virus.

Preliminary results show ring vaccination with the vaccine has been highly effective at reducing Ebola transmission.
