= Public health emergency of international concern =

Formal declaration by the World Health Organization

Logo of the World Health Organization, the authority that declares PHEICs

Map of WHO regional offices and their respective operating regions: Africa; HQ: Brazzaville, Republic of the Congo Americas; HQ: Washington, D.C., United States Eastern Mediterranean; HQ: Cairo, Egypt Europe; HQ: Copenhagen, Denmark South East Asia; HQ: New Delhi, India Western Pacific; HQ: Manila, Philippines

A public health emergency of international concern (PHEIC /feɪk/ FAKE) is a formal declaration by the World Health Organization (WHO) of "an extraordinary event which is determined to constitute a public health risk to other States through the international spread of disease and to potentially require a coordinated international response", formulated when a situation arises that is "serious, sudden, unusual, or unexpected", which "carries implications for public health beyond the affected state's national border" and "may require immediate international action". Under the 2005 International Health Regulations (IHR), states have a legal duty to respond promptly to a PHEIC. The declaration is publicized by an IHR Emergency Committee (EC) of international experts, which was developed following the 2002–2004 SARS outbreak.

Since 2005, there have been nine PHEIC declarations: the 2009–2010 H1N1 (or swine flu) pandemic, the ongoing 2014 polio declaration, the 2013–2016 outbreak of Ebola in Western Africa, the 2015–16 Zika virus epidemic, the 2018–2020 Kivu Ebola epidemic, the 2020–2023 declaration for the COVID-19 pandemic, the 2022–2023 and 2024 mpox outbreaks, and the 2026 Ituri Province Ebola epidemic. The recommendations are temporary and require reviews every three months.

Automatically, SARS, smallpox, wild type poliomyelitis, and any new subtype of human influenza are considered as PHEICs and thus do not require an IHR decision to declare them as such. A PHEIC is not only confined to infectious diseases, and may cover an emergency caused by exposure to a chemical agent or radioactive material. It can be seen as an "alarm system", a "call to action", and "last resort" measure.

== Background ==
Multiple surveillance and response systems exist worldwide for the early detection and effective response to contain the spread of disease. Time delays occur for two main reasons. The first is the delay between the first case and the confirmation of the outbreak by the healthcare system, allayed by good surveillance via data collection, evaluation, and organisation. The second is when there is a delay between the detection of the outbreak and widespread recognition and declaration of it as an international concern. The declaration is promulgated by an emergency committee (EC) made up of international experts operating under the IHR (2005), which was developed following the SARS outbreak of 2002–2003. Between 2009 and 2016, there were four PHEIC declarations. The fifth was the 2018–2020 Kivu Ebola epidemic, declared in July 2019 and ended in June 2020. The sixth was the COVID-19 pandemic, declared in January 2020 and ended in May 2023. The seventh was the 2022–2023 mpox outbreak, declared in July 2022 and ended in May 2023. Under the 2005 International Health Regulations (IHR), states have a legal duty to respond promptly to a PHEIC.

== Definition ==
PHEIC is defined as:

an extraordinary event which is determined to constitute a public health risk to other States through the international spread of disease and to potentially require a coordinated international response.

This definition designates a public health crisis of potentially global reach and implies a situation that is "serious, sudden, unusual, or unexpected", which may necessitate immediate international action. Designating an outbreak as a PHEIC can be seen as an "alarm system", a "call to action" and "last resort" measure.

== Potential concern reporting ==
WHO Member States have 24 hours within which to report potential PHEIC events to the WHO. It does not have to be a member state that reports a potential outbreak, hence reports to the WHO may also be received informally, by non-governmental sources. Under the IHR (2005), ways to detect, evaluate, notify, and report events were ascertained by all countries in order to avoid PHEICs. The response to public health risks also was decided.

The IHR decision algorithm assists WHO Member States in deciding whether a potential PHEIC exists and whether the WHO should be notified. The WHO should be notified if any two of the four following questions are affirmed:

- Is the public health impact of the event serious?
- Is the event unusual or unexpected?
- Is there a significant risk for international spread?
- Is there a significant risk for international travel or trade restrictions?

The PHEIC criteria include a list of diseases that are always notifiable. SARS, smallpox, wild type poliomyelitis, and any new subtype of human influenza are always a PHEIC and do not require an IHR decision to declare them as such.

Large scale health emergencies that attract public attention do not necessarily fulfill the criteria to be a PHEIC. ECs were not convened for the cholera outbreak in Haiti, chemical weapons use in Syria, or the Fukushima nuclear disaster in Japan, for example.

Further assessment is required for diseases that are prone to becoming pandemics, including, but not limited to cholera, pneumonic plague, yellow fever, and viral hemorrhagic fevers.

A declaration of a PHEIC may appear as an economic burden to the state facing the epidemic. Incentives to declare an epidemic are lacking and the PHEIC may be seen as placing limitations on trade in countries that already are struggling.

== IHR Emergency Committee ==
In order to declare a PHEIC, the WHO Director-General is required to take into account factors that include the risk to human health and international spread as well as advice from an international committee of experts, the IHR Emergency Committee (EC), one of whom should be an expert nominated by the State within whose region the event arises. Rather than being a standing committee, the EC is created on an ad hoc basis.

Until 2011, the names of IHR EC members were not publicly disclosed; in the wake of reforms, now they are. These members are selected according to the disease in question and the nature of the event. Names are taken from the IHR Experts Roster. The director-general takes the advice of the EC, following their technical assessment of the crisis using legal criteria and a predetermined algorithm after a review of all available data on the event. Upon declaration, the EC then makes recommendations on actions the director-general and member states should take to address the crisis. The recommendations are temporary and require review every three months.

== Declarations ==
Summary of PHEIC declarations

=== Swine flu (2009–2010) ===
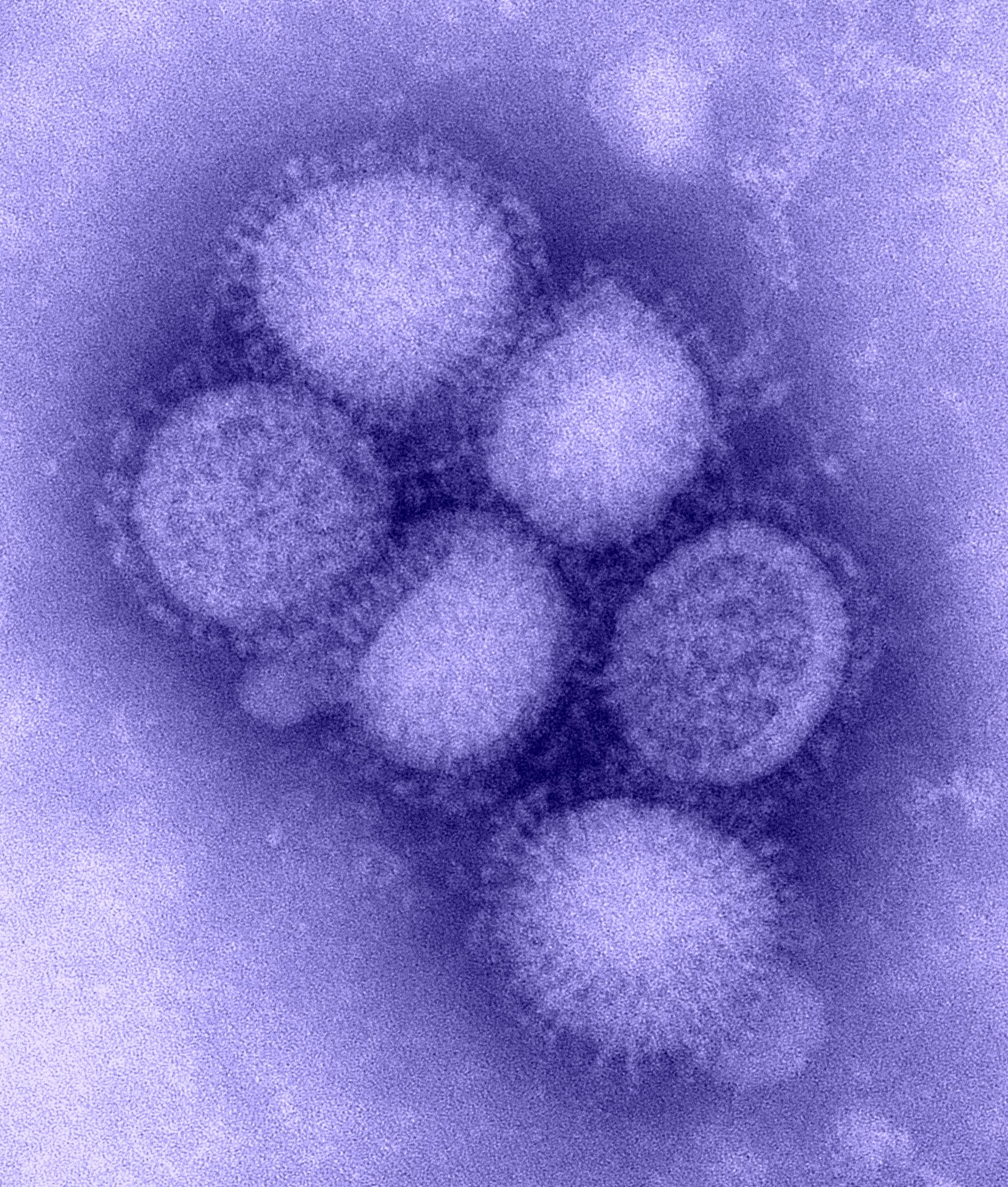
H1N1 influenza virus

In the spring of 2009, a novel influenza A (H1N1) virus emerged. It was detected first in Mexico, North America. It spread quickly across the United States and the world. On 26 April 2009, more than one month after its first emergence, the initial PHEIC was declared when the H1N1 (or swine flu) pandemic was still in phase three. Within three hours on the same day, the WHO web site received almost two million visits, necessitating a dedicated web site for the swine influenza pandemic. At the time that H1N1 had been declared a PHEIC, it had occurred in only three countries. Therefore, it was argued that the declaration of the H1N1 outbreak as a PHEIC was fueling public fear. A 2013 study sponsored by the WHO estimated that, although similar in magnitude to seasonal influenza, it cost more life-years than seasonal flu, due to a shift toward mortality among persons less than 65 years of age.

=== Polio (2014–present) ===
The second PHEIC was the 2014 polio declaration, issued on 5 May 2014 with a rise in cases of wild polio and circulating vaccine-derived poliovirus. The status achieved, as global eradication, was deemed to be at risk by air travel and border crossing overland, with small numbers of cases in Afghanistan, Pakistan, and Nigeria.

In October 2019, continuing cases of wild polio in Pakistan and Afghanistan, in addition to new vaccine-derived cases in Africa and Asia, were reviewed and polio continued to be a PHEIC. As of November 2021, taking into account recent events in Afghanistan, a large number of unvaccinated children, increasing mobile people in Pakistan and the risks associated with the COVID-19 pandemic among others, polio remains a PHEIC.

=== Ebola (2013–2016) ===
Confirmed cases of Ebola were being reported in Guinea in December 2013 and Liberia in March 2014 and Sierra Leone by May 2014. On 8 August 2014, following the occurrence of Ebola in the United States and Europe and with the already intense transmission ongoing in three other countries for months, the WHO declared its third PHEIC in response to the outbreak of Ebola in Western Africa. Later, one review showed that a direct impact of this epidemic on America escalated a PHEIC declaration. It was the first PHEIC in a resource-poor setting.

=== Zika virus (2016) ===
On 1 February 2016, the WHO declared its fourth PHEIC in response to clusters of microcephaly and Guillain–Barré syndrome in the Americas, which at the time were suspected to be associated with the ongoing 2015–16 Zika virus epidemic. Later research and evidence bore out these concerns; in April, the WHO stated that "there is scientific consensus that Zika virus is a cause of microcephaly and Guillain–Barré syndrome." This was the first time a PHEIC was declared for a mosquito‐borne disease. This declaration was lifted on 18 November 2016.

=== Kivu Ebola (2019–2020) ===
In October 2018 and then later in April 2019, the WHO did not consider the 2018–2020 Kivu Ebola epidemic to be a PHEIC. The decision was controversial, with Michael Osterholm, director of the Center for Infectious Disease Research and Policy (CIDRAP) responding with disappointment and describing the situation as "an Ebola gas can sitting in DRC that's just waiting for a match to hit it", while the WHO panel were unanimous in their decision that declaring it a PHEIC would not give any added benefit. The advice against declaring a PHEIC in October 2018 and April 2019, despite the criteria for doing so appearing to be met on both occasions, has led to the transparency of the IHR EC coming into question. The language used in the statements for the Kivu Ebola epidemic has been noted to be different. In October 2018, the EC stated "a PHEIC should not be declared at this time". In the 13 previously declined proposals for declaring a PHEIC, the resultant statements quoted "the conditions for a PHEIC are not currently met" and "does not constitute a PHEIC". In April 2019, they stated that "there is no added benefit to declaring a PHEIC at this stage", a notion that is not part of the PHEIC criteria laid down in the IHR.

After confirmed cases of Ebola in neighbouring Uganda in June 2019, Tedros Adhanom, the director-general of the WHO, announced that the third meeting of a group of experts would be held on 14 June 2019 to assess whether the Ebola spread had become a PHEIC. The conclusion was that while the outbreak was a health emergency in the Democratic Republic of the Congo (DRC) and the region, it did not meet all the three criteria for a PHEIC. Despite the number of deaths reaching 1,405 by 11 June 2019 and 1,440 by 17 June 2019, the reason for not declaring a PHEIC was that the overall risk of international spread was deemed to be low, and the risk of damaging the economy of the DRC high. Adhanom also stated that declaring a PHEIC would be an inappropriate way to raise money for the epidemic. Following a visit to the DRC in July 2019, Rory Stewart, the UK's DfID minister, called for the WHO to declare it an emergency.

Acknowledging a high risk of spread to the capital of North Kivu, Goma, a call for a PHEIC declaration was published on 10 July 2019 in The Washington Post by Daniel Lucey and Ron Klain (the former United States Ebola response coordinator). Their declaration stated that "in the absence of a trajectory toward extinguishing the outbreak, the opposite path—severe escalation—remains possible. The risk of the disease moving into nearby Goma, Congo—a city of 1 million residents with an international airport—or crossing into the massive refugee camps in South Sudan is mounting. With a limited number of vaccine doses remaining, either would be a catastrophe". Four days later, on 14 July 2019, a case of Ebola was confirmed in Goma, which has an international airport and a highly mobile population. Subsequently, the WHO announced a reconvening of a fourth EC meeting on 17 July 2019, when they officially announced it "a regional emergency, and by no means a global threat" and declared it as a PHEIC, without restrictions on trade or travel. In response to the declaration, the president of the DRC, together with an expert committee led by a virologist, took responsibility for directly supervising action, while in protest of the declaration health minister Oly Ilunga Kalenga resigned. A review of the PHEIC had been planned at a fifth meeting of the EC on 10 October 2019 and on 18 October 2019 it remained a PHEIC until 26 June 2020 when it was decided that the situation no longer constituted a PHEIC, as the outbreak was considered over.

=== COVID-19 (2020–2023) ===
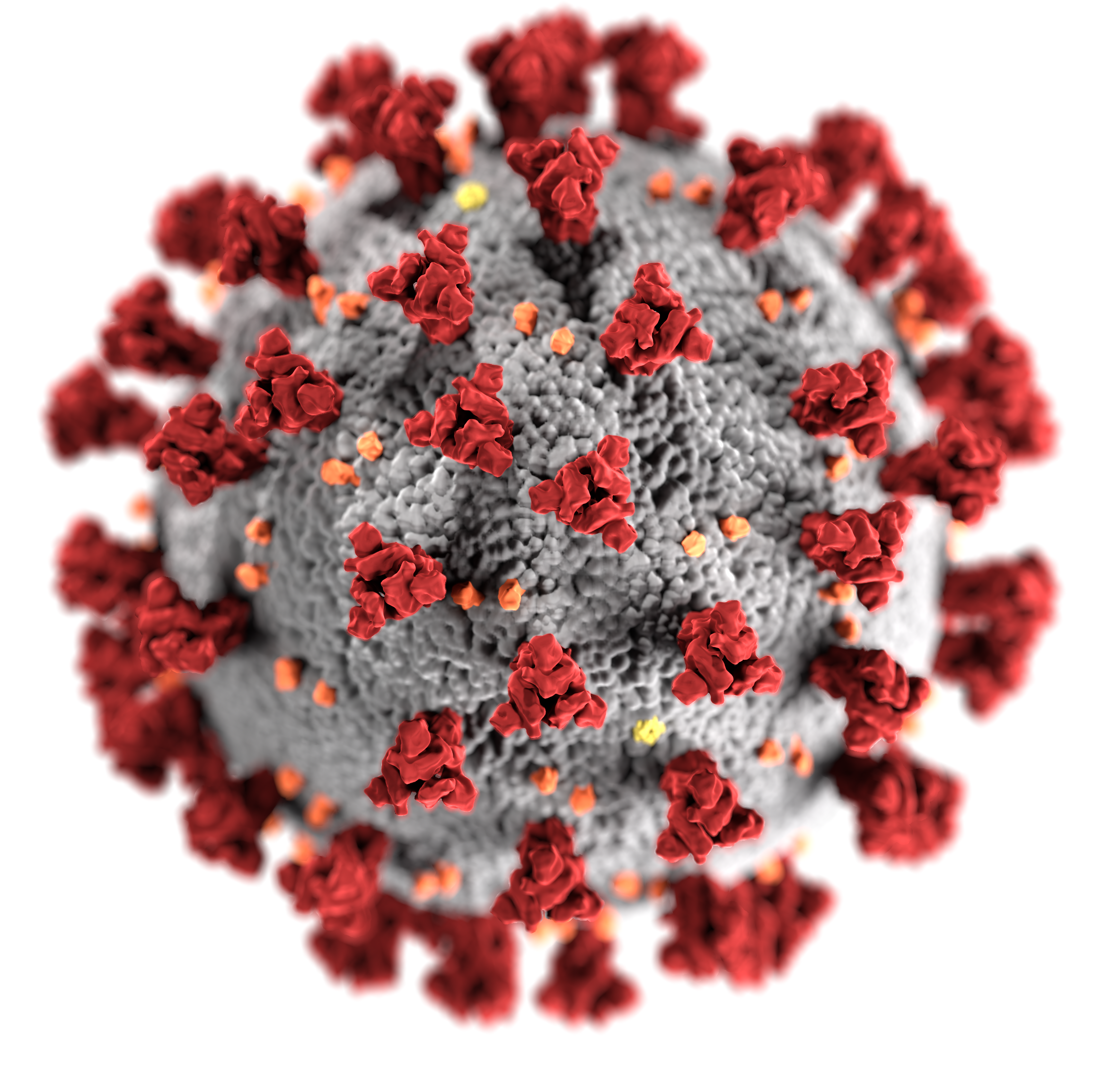
Morphology of SARS-CoV-2

On 30 January 2020, the WHO declared the outbreak of COVID-19, centered on Wuhan in central China, a PHEIC. On 5 May 2023, the WHO ended the PHEIC declaration for COVID-19.

On the date of the declaration, there were 7,818 cases confirmed globally, affecting 19 countries in five of the six WHO regions. Previously, the WHO had held EC meetings on 22 and 23 January 2020 regarding the outbreak, but it was determined at that time that it was too early to declare a PHEIC, given the lack of necessary data and the then-scale of global impact.

The WHO recognized the spread of COVID-19 as a pandemic on 11 March 2020. The emergency committee convened its third meeting on 30 April 2020, fourth on 31 July, fifth on 29 October, sixth on 14 January 2021, seventh on 15 April 2021, ninth in October 2021, tenth in January 2022, eleventh in April 2022, twelfth in July 2022, thirteenth in October 2022, fourteenth in January 2023, and fifteenth in May 2023.

In September 2022, the Lancet commission on COVID-19 published a report, calling the response to the pandemic "a massive global failure on multiple levels". The WHO responded by noting "several key omissions and misinterpretations in the report, not least regarding the public health emergency of international concern (PHEIC) and the speed and scope of WHO's actions." They stated that the report "offers the best opportunity to insist that the failures and lessons from the past 3 years are not wasted but are constructively used to build more resilient health systems and stronger political systems that support the health and wellbeing of people and planet during the 21st century."

The formal end of the COVID-19 PHEIC is a matter of much nuance which carries its own risks, and as of March 2023, "WHO member states are negotiating amendments to the International Health Regulations as well as a new legally binding agreement (most likely a treaty) on pandemic prevention, preparedness, and response. Proposals include the possibility of issuing intermediate public health alerts (short of PHEICs) and determining public health emergencies of regional concern. Notably, although COVID-19 is routinely referred to as a pandemic, this word is not used in the International Health Regulations." With the emergency phase of the pandemic being regarded as having ended, more subtle and robust institutional responses and protocols are in the works for further iterations of this pandemic as well as global pandemics of whatever etiology.

=== Clade II mpox (2022–2023) ===
At the second IHR meeting for the 2022–2023 mpox outbreak on 21 July 2022, members of the emergency committee were divided about issuing a PHEIC, with six in favor and nine against. On 23 July 2022, the WHO director-general declared the outbreak a PHEIC. On 11 May 2023, the WHO ended the PHEIC declaration for Mpox, six days after doing so for COVID-19.

On the date of the declaration, there were 17,186 cases reported globally, affecting 75 countries in all six WHO regions, with five deaths reported outside Africa and 72 deaths in African countries. The WHO had previously held an EC meeting on 23 June 2022 regarding the outbreak, which had more than 2,100 cases in over 42 countries at that point; it did not reach the criteria for a PHEIC alert at the time. It was re-classified a PHEIC in August 2024.

=== Clade I mpox (2024–2026) ===
After an IHR meeting on 14 August 2024, the WHO declared an mpox outbreak in parts of Africa, of a new variant of the disease, a PHEIC. This marked the second time in three years that the WHO has classified an mpox outbreak as a global emergency. As of 17 August 2024, over 15,600 cases and 537 deaths had been reported in the outbreak, with approximately 96% of cases occurring in the Democratic Republic of the Congo (DRC). Four other African countries, some for the first time, also reported cases. The PHEIC status was announced to be over on 5 September 2025, following an announcement from WHO's director general, Tedros Adhanom Ghebreyesus, that he had accepted the recommendation of an expert committee to end the PHEIC status owing to "sustained declines in cases and deaths in the Democratic Republic of the Congo and other affected countries including Burundi, Sierra Leone and Uganda". Standing recommendations for mpox were extended until August 2026, to support Member States worldwide.

=== Ebola (2026–present) ===
The 2026 epidemic of the Bundibugyo ebolavirus in Uganda and the Ituri Province of the DRC was declared a PHEIC by the WHO on 16 May 2026.

== Response ==
In 2018, an examination of the first four declarations (2009–2016) showed that the WHO was noted to be more effective in responding to international health emergencies, and that the international system in dealing with these emergencies was "robust". Another review of the first four declarations, with the exception of wild polio, demonstrated that responses were varied. Severe outbreaks, or those that threatened larger numbers of people, did not receive a swift PHEIC declaration, and the study hypothesized that responses were quicker when American citizens were infected and when the emergencies did not coincide with holidays. Some countries have underfunded their health care sectors resulting in low epidemic preparedness.

== Non-declarations ==
World MERS outbreak

PHEIC was not invoked with the Middle Eastern Respiratory Syndrome (MERS) outbreak in 2013. Originating in Saudi Arabia, MERS reached more than 24 countries and resulted in 876 deaths by May 2020, although most cases were in hospital settings rather than sustained community spread. As a result, what constitutes a PHEIC has been unclear.

== Non-infectious events ==
PHEIC are not confined to only infectious diseases or biological ones. It may cover events caused by chemical agents or radioactive materials.

Debate exists regarding whether the emergence and spread of antimicrobial resistance may constitute a PHEIC.

In 2026, the Pan-European Commission on Climate and Health urged the WHO to declare the anthropogenic climate change a PHEIC.

== See also ==
- Biosecurity
- Disease X
- Public health emergency (United States)
- State of emergency
