= Red Cross of the Democratic Republic of the Congo =

The Red Cross of the Democratic Republic of the Congo is the Red Cross member organization for the Democratic Republic of the Congo. It was founded by the International Committee of the Red Cross (ICRC) and admitted to the International Federation of Red Cross and Red Crescent Societies (IFRC) in 1963. An unrelated earlier Red Cross society had existed in the Congo Free State under King Leopold II of Belgium's rule, and disbanded in 1909.
