= Monitored Emergency Use of Unregistered and Investigational Interventions =

Ethical protocol of the WHO

Monitored Emergency Use of Unregistered and Investigational Interventions (MEURI) is an ethical protocol developed by the World Health Organization to evaluate the potential use of experimental drugs in the event of public health emergencies. The protocol was created by the WHO Ebola Ethics Working Group in 2014 in the context of the 2014 West Africa Ebola outbreak. The WHO recommends that the term be preferred to the term "compassionate use" or "expanded access" for the controlled use of unregistered treatments in public health emergency measures.
