= ZMapp =

Experimental treatment for Ebola virus disease

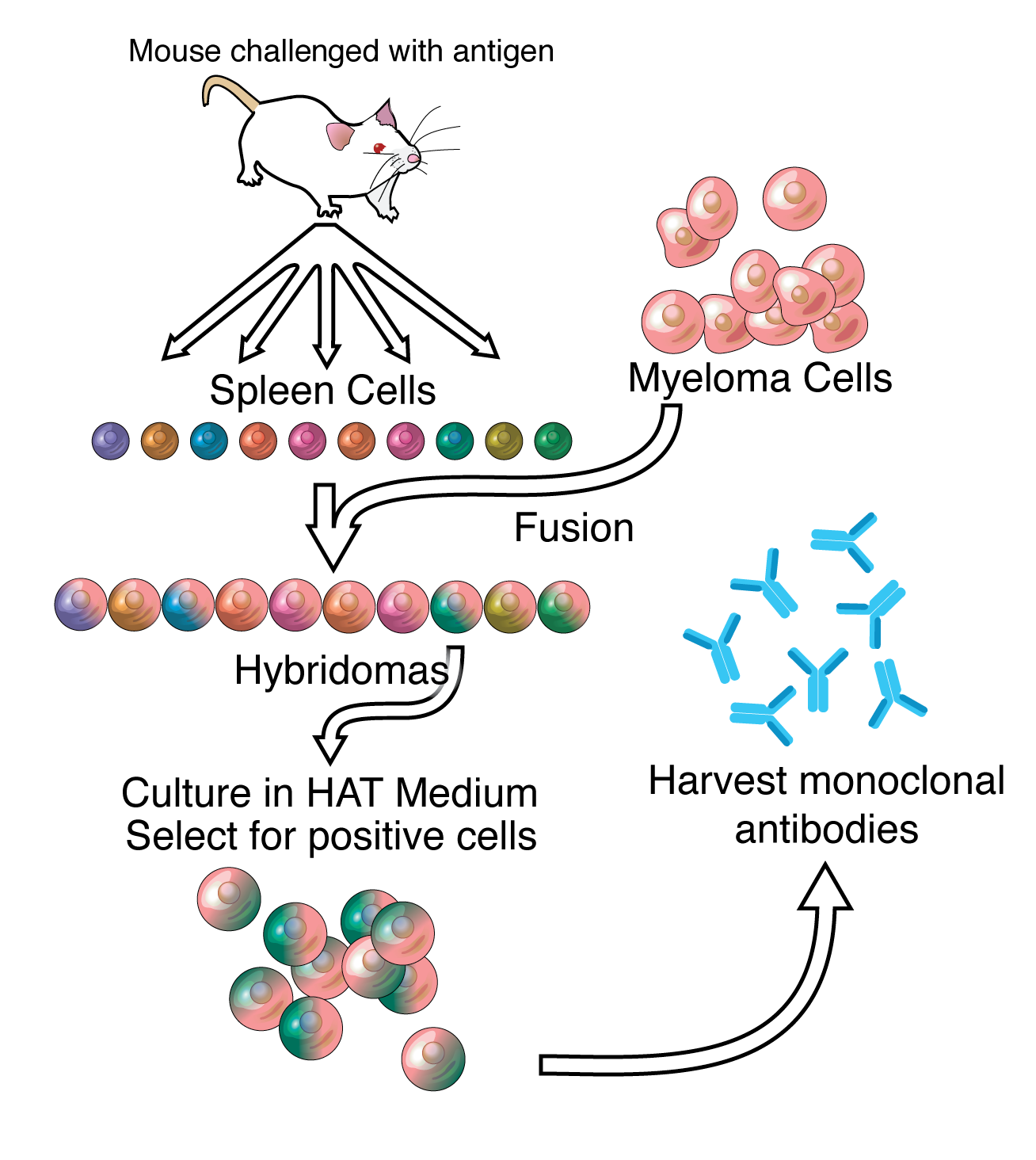
Schematic representation of how monoclonal antibodies are generally made from hybridomas. To make ZMapp, the genes encoding for the antibodies were extracted from the hybridomas, genetically engineered to replace mouse components with human components, and transfected into tobacco plants.

ZMapp is an experimental biopharmaceutical medication comprising three chimeric monoclonal antibodies under development as a treatment for Ebola virus disease. Two of the three components were originally developed at the Public Health Agency of Canada's National Microbiology Laboratory (NML), and the third at the U.S. Army Medical Research Institute of Infectious Diseases; the cocktail was optimized by Gary Kobinger, a research scientist at the NML and underwent further development under license by Mapp Biopharmaceutical. ZMapp was first used on humans during the Western African Ebola virus epidemic, having only been previously tested on animals and not yet subjected to a randomized controlled trial. The National Institutes of Health (NIH) ran a clinical trial starting in January 2015 with 72 subjects from Sierra Leone, Guinea, and Liberia. It had aimed to enroll 200 people, but the epidemic waned and the trial closed early, leaving it too statistically underpowered to give a meaningful result about whether ZMapp worked.

== Chemistry ==
The drug is composed of three monoclonal antibodies (mAbs), initially harvested from mice exposed to Ebola virus proteins, that have been chimerized with human constant regions. The components are chimeric monoclonal antibody c13C6 from a previously existing antibody cocktail called "MB-003" and two chimeric mAbs from a different antibody cocktail called ZMab, c2G4, and c4G7. ZMapp is manufactured in the tobacco plant Nicotiana benthamiana in the bioproduction process known as "pharming" by Kentucky BioProcessing, a subsidiary of Reynolds American.

== Mechanism of action ==
Like intravenous immunoglobulin therapy, ZMapp contains a mixture of neutralizing antibodies that confer passive immunity to an individual, enhancing the normal immune response, and is designed to be administered after exposure to the Ebola virus. Such antibodies have been used in the treatment and prevention of various infectious diseases and are intended to attack the virus by interfering with its surface and neutralizing it to prevent further damage.

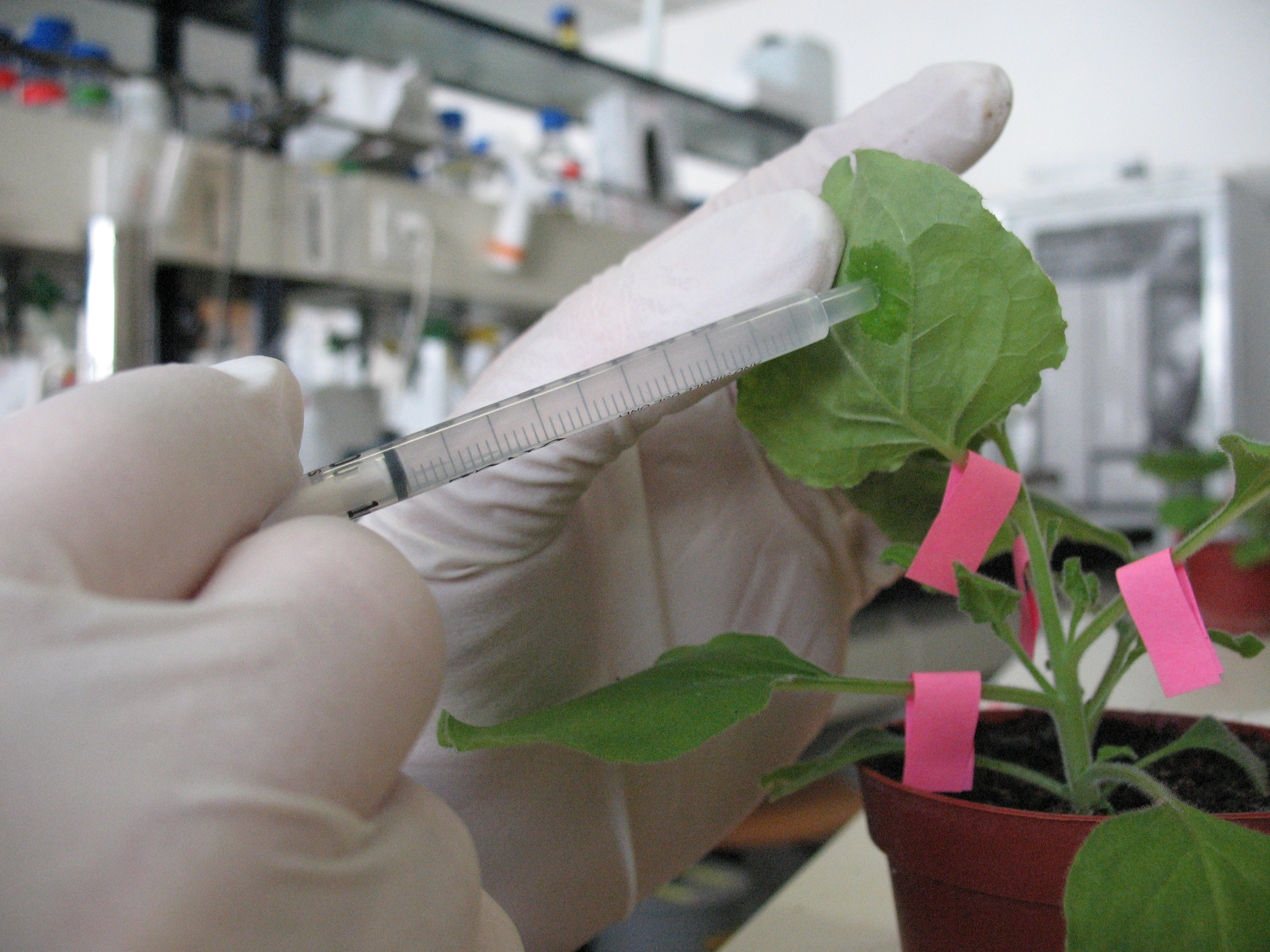
The Nicotiana benthamiana tobacco plant

== History ==
Two of the drug's three components were originally developed at the Public Health Agency of Canada's National Microbiology Laboratory (NML), and a third at the U.S. Army Medical Research Institute of Infectious Diseases; the cocktail was optimized by Gary Kobinger, then branch chief of the NML, and is undergoing further development by Leaf Biopharmaceutical (LeafBio, Inc.), a San Diego–based arm of Mapp Biopharmaceutical. LeafBio created ZMapp in collaboration with its parent and Defyrus Inc., each of which had licensed its own cocktail of antibodies, called MB-003 and ZMab.

=== MB-003 ===
MB-003 is a cocktail of three humanized or human–mouse chimeric mAbs: c13C6, h13F6, and c6D8. A study published in September 2012 found that rhesus macaques infected with Ebola virus (EBOV) survived when receiving MB-003 (mixture of 3 chimeric monoclonal antibodies) one hour after infection. When treated 24 or 48 hours after infection, four of six animals survived and had little to no viremia and few, if any, clinical symptoms.

MB-003 was created by scientists at the U.S. Army Medical Research Institute of Infectious Diseases, Gene Olinger, and Jamie Pettitt in collaboration with Mapp Biopharmaceutical with years of funding from US government agencies including the National Institute of Allergy and Infectious Disease, Biomedical Advanced Research and Development Authority, and the Defense Threat Reduction Agency.

=== ZMAb ===
ZMAb is a mixture of three mouse mAbs: m1H3, m2G4, and m4G7. A study published in November 2013 found that EBOV-infected macaque monkeys survived after being given a therapy with a combination of three EBOV surface glycoprotein (EBOV-GP)-specific monoclonal antibodies (ZMAb) within 24 hours of infection. The authors concluded that post-exposure treatment resulted in a robust immune response, with good protection for up to 10 weeks and some protection at 13 weeks. ZMab was created by the NML and licensed to Defyrus, a Toronto-based biodefense company, with further funding by the Public Health Agency of Canada.

=== ZMapp ===
A 2014 paper described how Mapp and its collaborators, including investigators at Public Health Agency of Canada, Kentucky BioProcessing, and the National Institute of Allergy and Infectious Diseases, first chimerized the three antibodies comprising ZMAb, then tested combinations of MB-003 and the chimeric ZMAb antibodies in guinea pigs and then primates to determine the best combination, which turned out to be c13C6 from MB-003 and two chimeric mAbs from ZMAb, c2G4 and c4G7. This is ZMapp.

In an experiment also published in the 2014 paper, 21 rhesus macaque primates were infected with the Kikwit Congolese variant of EBOV. Three primates in the control arm were given a non-functional antibody, and the 18 in the treatment arm were divided into three groups of six. All primates in the treatment arm received three doses of ZMapp, spaced 3 days apart. The first treatment group received its first dose on 3rd day after being infected; the second group on the 4th day after being infected, and the third group, on the 5th day after being infected. All three primates in the control group died; all 18 primates in the treatment arm survived. Mapp then went on to show that ZMapp inhibits replication of a Guinean strain of EBOV in cell cultures.

Mapp remains involved in the production of the drug through its contracts with Kentucky BioProcessing, a subsidiary of Reynolds American. To produce the drug, genes coding for the chimeric mAbs were inserted into viral vectors, and tobacco plants are infected with the viral vector encoding for the antibodies, using Agrobacterium cultures. Subsequently, antibodies are extracted and purified from the plants. Once the genes encoding the chimeric mAbs are in hand, the entire tobacco production cycle is believed to take a few months. The development of these production methods was funded by the U.S. Defense Advanced Research Projects Agency as part of its bio-defense efforts following the 9/11 terrorist attacks.

== Use during the 2014–2016 Ebola outbreak in West Africa ==
ZMapp was first used during the 2014 West Africa Ebola Virus outbreak, having not previously undergone any human clinical trials to determine its efficacy or potential risks. By October 2014, the United States Food and Drug Administration had approved the use of several experimental drugs, including ZMapp, to be used on patients infected with Ebola virus. The use of such drugs during the epidemic was also deemed ethical by the World Health Organization (WHO). In 2014, a limited supply of ZMapp was used to treat 7 individuals infected with the Ebola virus; of these 2 died. The outcome is not considered to be statistically significant. Mapp announced in August 2014, that supplies of ZMapp had been exhausted.

=== Controversy ===
The lack of drugs and unavailability of experimental treatment in the most affected regions of the West African Ebola virus outbreak spurred some controversy. The fact that the drug was first given to Americans and a European and not to Africans, according to the Los Angeles Times, "provoked outrage, feeding into African perceptions of Western insensitivity and arrogance, with a deep sense of mistrust and betrayal still lingering over the exploitation and abuses of the colonial era". Salim S. Abdool Karim, the director of an AIDS research center in South Africa, placed the issue in the context of the history of exploitation and abuses. Responding to a question on how people might have reacted if ZMapp and other drugs had first been used on Africans, he said "It would have been the front-page screaming headline: 'Africans used as guinea pigs for American drug company's medicine'".

In August 2014, the World Health Organization called for convening a panel of medical authorities "to consider whether experimental drugs should be more widely released." In a statement, Peter Piot (co-discoverer of the Ebola virus); Jeremy Farrar, the director of the Wellcome Trust; and David Heymann of the Chatham House Center on Global Health Security, called for the release of experimental drugs for the 2014 West Africa Ebola outbreak.

At an August 2014 press conference, Barack Obama, the President of the United States, was questioned regarding whether the cocktail should be fast-tracked for approval or be made available to sick patients outside of the United States. He responded, "I think we've got to let the science guide us. I don't think all the information's in on whether this drug is helpful."

== Clinical trial ==
The National Institutes of Health announced on 27 February 2015 the commencement of a randomized controlled trial of ZMapp to be conducted in Liberia and the United States. From March 2015 through November 2015, 72 individuals infected with the Ebola virus were enrolled in the trial; investigators stopped enrolling new subjects in January 2016, having failed to reach its enrollment goal of 200 due to the waning of the Ebola outbreak. As a result, although a 40% lower risk of death was calculated for those who received ZMapp, the difference was not statistically significant and ultimately it could not be determined whether the use of ZMapp was superior to the optimized standard of care alone. However, ZMapp was found to be safe and well tolerated.

== Use during the 2018-19 Kivu Ebola outbreak in the Democratic Republic of the Congo ==
The ZMapp cocktail was assessed by the World Health Organization for emergency use under the Monitored Emergency Use of Unregistered and Investigational Interventions (MEURI) ethical protocol. The panel agreed that "the benefits of ZMapp outweigh its risks" while noting that it presented logistical challenges, particularly that of requiring a cold chain for distribution and storage. Four alternative therapies (remdesivir, the Regeneron product atoltivimab/maftivimab/odesivimab, favipiravir, and ansuvimab) were also considered for use, but they were at earlier stages of development. In August 2019, the Democratic Republic of the Congo's national health authorities, the World Health Organization, and the National Institutes of Health announced that they would stop using ZMapp, along with all other Ebola treatments except atoltivimab/maftivimab/odesivimab and ansuvimab, in their ongoing clinical trials, citing the higher mortality rates of patients not treated with atoltivimab/maftivimab/odesivimab and ansuvimab.

In October 2020, the US Food and Drug Administration (FDA) approved atoltivimab/maftivimab/odesivimab with an indication for the treatment of infection caused by Zaire ebolavirus.
