= Bibliography of Ebola =

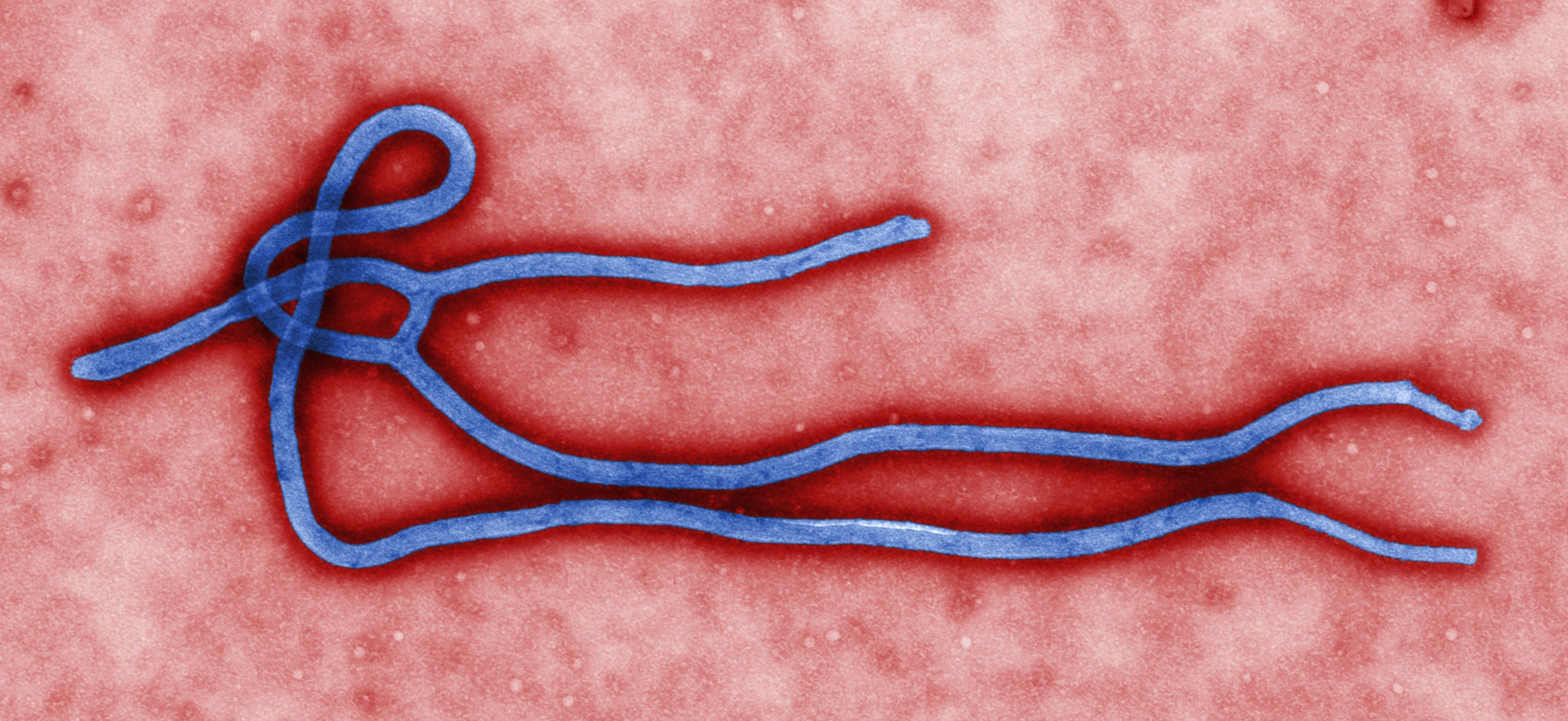
Electron micrograph of an Ebola virus virion

This is a bibliography of the Ebola virus disease, also known as Ebola hemorrhagic fever, a viral hemorrhagic fever of humans and other primates caused by ebolaviruses.

It includes non-fiction works relating to the background and history of the disease, general works, memoirs of those involved in outbreaks such as health workers, works about the effects on particular groups of individuals, and a link to the World Health Organization list of publications about Ebola.

== Background and history ==
- Pattyn S., et al "Isolation of Marburg-like virus from a case of haemorrhagic fever in Zaire", The Lancet, 1977 Mar 12;1(8011):573-4.
- Quammen, David. (2014) Ebola: The Natural and Human History. Bodley Head, London, 2014. ISBN 978-1847923431

== General ==
- Abdullah, Ibrahim & Ismail Rashid (Eds.) (2017) Understanding West Africa's Ebola Epidemic: Towards a Political Economy. Zed Books. ISBN 978-1786991690
- Crawford, Dorothy H. (2016) Ebola: Profile of a Killer Virus. Oxford: Oxford University Press. ISBN 978-0198759997
- Evans, Nicholas G. et al (Eds.) (2016) Ebola's Message: Public Health and Medicine in the Twenty-First Century. MIT Press. ISBN 978-0262035071
- Farmer, Paul (2020) Fevers, Feuds, and Diamonds: Ebola and the Ravages of History. Farrar, Straus and Giroux. ISBN 978-0374234324
- Hewlett, Barry S. & Bonnie L. Hewlett. (2008) Ebola, Culture and Politics: The Anthropology of an Emerging Disease. ISBN 9780495009184
- Hofman, Michiel & Sokhieng Au (Eds.) (2017) The Politics of Fear: Médecins sans Frontières and the West African Ebola Epidemic. New York: Oxford University Press. ISBN 978-0190624477
- Preston, Richard. (1994) The Hot Zone. Anchor.
- Richards, Paul. (2016) Ebola: How a People's Science Helped End an Epidemic. Zed Books. ISBN 978-1783608584
- Smith, Tara C. (2005) Ebola. Chelsea House Publications. ISBN 9780791085059

== Memoirs ==
- Brantly, Kent. (2015) Called for Life: How Loving Our Neighbor Led us into the Heart of the Ebola Epidemic. Colorado Springs: WaterBrook Press. ISBN 978-1601428257
- Bullard, Stephan Gregory. (2018) A Day-by-Day Chronicle of the 2013-2016 Ebola Outbreak. Springer. ISBN 978-3-319-76565-5
- Hatch, Steven. (2017) Inferno: A Doctor’s Ebola Story. St. Martin's Press. ISBN 978-1-250-08513-9
- Lai, Kwan Kew. (2018) Lest We Forget: A Doctor’s Experience with Life and Death During the Ebola Outbreak. Viva Editions.
- Spencer, C. "Having and Fighting Ebola — Public Health Lessons from a Clinician Turned Patient", New England Journal of Medicine, 372 (12): 1089–91. doi:10.1056/NEJMp1501355. PMID 25714039.
- Walsh, Sinead & Oliver Johnson. (2018) Getting to Zero: A Doctor and a Diplomat on the Ebola Frontline. Zed Books.

== Maternal health ==
- Bebell, Lisa M. et al "Ebola Virus Disease and Pregnancy: A Review of the Current Knowledge of Ebola Virus Pathogenesis, Maternal, and Neonatal Outcomes", Birth Defects Research, 2017 Mar 15; 109(5): 353–362. doi: 10.1002/bdra.23558
- Schwartz, David A. et al (Ed.) (2019) Pregnant in the Time of Ebola: Women and Their Children in the 2013-2015 West African Epidemic. Springer. ISBN 9783319976365

== World Health Organization publications ==
Full list here.
