= Mayinga N'Seka =

Congolese nurse who died from Ebola in 1976

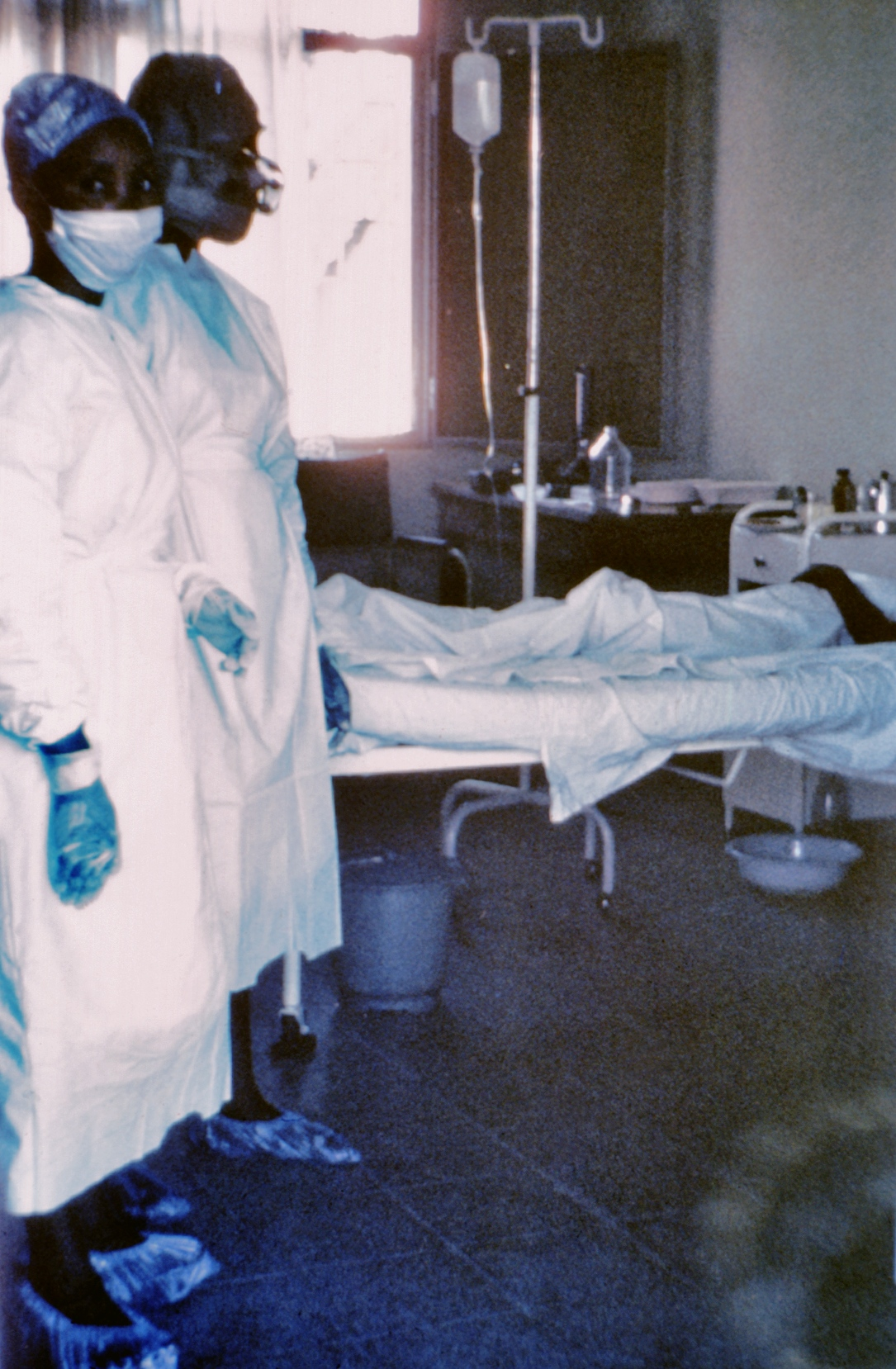
- Two nurses stand in front of N'Seka's bed at Ngaliema Hospital, in Kinshasa, Zaïre.
- Born: 1954
- Died: October 19, 1976 (aged 22); Ngaleima Hospital, Kinshasa, Zaire
- Cause of death: Zaire ebolavirus
- Occupation: Nurse
- Employer(s): Mbalad Hospital, Kinshasa
- Known for: Early casualty of 1976 Zaire Ebola virus outbreak, incorrectly identified as index case

Mayinga N'Seka (1954 – October 19, 1976) was a nurse in Zaire, now the Democratic Republic of the Congo. She died from Ebola virus disease during the 1976 epidemic in Zaire. She was incorrectly identified as the index case by several sources, but a World Health Organization commission report on the outbreak lists a man from Yambuku, Mabalo Lokela, as the index case. Lokela, a 44-year-old who had been buying meat in Sudan, died on September 8, 1976, over a month before N'Seka.

== Biography ==
N'Seka worked as a nurse at Mbalad Hospital in Kinshasa and contracted Ebola after caring for a Roman Catholic nun who had flown in for treatment from the Yambuku Mission Hospital, where the outbreak began. Mayinga died at Ngaleima Hospital on October 19, 1976. There were 318 cases in that outbreak, which had an 88% mortality rate.

In his book about the 1976 outbreak, Ebola, William Close writes that N'Seka had treated a nun, Sister Fermina, who worked at the Catholic mission in Yambuku, the center of the outbreak. Another nun and a priest had also been brought to the capital for treatment. Officials hurried to find N'Seka's contacts in the city, including staff of the United States Embassy (where she had been finalizing a student visa). Fermina died at the hospital in Kinshasa while trying to return to Belgium so a diagnosis on the disease could be performed. The highly infectious and deadly nature of the disease was still unknown when N'Seka treated Fermina, and no special precautions were taken to prevent contact with the nun's blood or fluids. The 22-year-old N'Seka was preparing to travel to the United States to study advanced nursing on a scholarship at the time of her death.

== Legacy ==
The variant of the Ebola virus that infected N'Seka was originally named "Zaire virus strain Mayinga" (now Ebola virus variant Mayinga; EBOV/May) and is the prototype virus for the species Zaire ebolavirus, which is itself the type species for the genus Ebolavirus.

N'Seka's blood has also been used all over the world in procuring various strain frequencies and structures about the Ebola virus. No agreement was made with the government to distribute it.
