= Colleen Kraft =

American medical researcher

- Born: Colleen Suzanne Kendrick; October 30, 1976 (age 50)
- Education: Taylor University, BA (1998); Indiana University School of Medicine, MD (2002); Emory University, MSc (2013)
- Known for: Response to Ebola and COVID-19 outbreaks
- Children: 3
- Scientific career
- Fields: Infectious Diseases
- Workplaces: Emory University
- Website: Research website

Colleen S. Kraft is an infectious disease physician, associate professor in the Department of Pathology and Laboratory Medicine, and the director of the Clinical Virology Research Laboratory at Emory University School of Medicine. In 2014, she led Emory University Hospital's effort to treat and care for Ebola virus disease patients and is currently working to address the COVID-19 pandemic in Georgia. She currently serves on Georgia's COVID-19 task force.

== Education ==
Kraft received her Bachelor of Arts degree from Taylor University in Biology with a pre-medicine concentration in 1998. She then attended Indiana University School of Medicine, where she received her Doctor of Medicine degree in 2002. She then performed her residency in Internal Medicine and fellowship in Infectious Disease and Medical Microbiology at Emory University. She later received her Master of Science in clinical research from Emory University in 2013.

== Career ==
Kraft became an assistant professor at Emory University School of Medicine in 2010 and was promoted to associate professor in 2016. She became the Associate Chief Medical Officer of Emory University Hospital in January 2020. Her research interests include fecal microbiota transplants, building a large solid organ transplant population at Emory University Hospital to treat antibiotic resistant and hospital-acquired infections of Clostridioides difficile. In addition, she has both studied and advanced clinical care of Ebola virus disease and COVID-19 disease 2019.

=== Ebola response ===
Emory University Hospital received the first patient with Ebola virus disease, a missionary and physician named Kent Brantly, on August 2, 2014, followed by three patients with the disease, including the physician Ian Crozier. During that time, she worked on developing a protocol for the first known successful delivery of renal replacement therapy to treat kidney failure in Ebola patients. Kraft is a co-PI for the National Ebola Training and Education Center, a federally funded collaborative between Emory University, Nebraska Medicine, and New York Health and Hospital-Bellevue that is working to address gaps in outbreak preparedness. As a result, Emory's Serious Communicable Diseases Unit remains prepared to treat Ebola patients.

=== COVID-19 response ===
In response to the COVID-19 pandemic, Kraft was appointed to the 18-member task force of health, airport, school and emergency preparedness officials to address and mitigate the spread of COVID-19 in Georgia, advising Governor Brian Kemp. As Associate Chief Medical Officer, she is also coordinating the response to the pandemic across Emory University's healthcare system, working to ensure that healthcare workers on the frontlines do not contract the disease and avoid burnout. They have already launched three in-house testing platforms that can provide COVID-19 testing results in 24 hours, as opposed to commercial labs that were taking 7–10 days.

Kraft was part of a research team that found that reusable respirators, which are typically used by construction or factory workers, could be a suitable alternative to the disposable N95 masks currently used by physicians treating COVID-19 patients. Healthcare workers can be rapidly fit tested and trained on how to use the reusable masks, and use of such masks can address the current shortage of N95 masks. There is currently no stockpile of reusable respirators, however, construction workers have begun donating them to local hospitals. Kraft is also working with researchers at Georgia Tech to supply the medical community with 3D printers and laser-cutting machines to make protective gear.

== Awards and honors ==
- 2022 – President of the American Society for Microbiology

== Selected publications ==
- "Training and Fit Testing of Health Care Personnel for Reusable Elastomeric Half-Mask Respirators Compared With Disposable N95 Respirators" JAMA Published online March 25, 2020. doi:10.1001/jama.2020.4806
- "A Novel Microbiome Therapeutic Increases Gut Microbial Diversity and Prevents Recurrent Clostridium difficile Infection" The Journal of Infectious Diseases 2016; 214(2):173-181. doi:10.1093/infdis/jiv766
- "Clinical care of two patients with Ebola virus disease in the United States" New England Journal of Medicine 2014; 371:2402-2409. doi:10.1056/NEJMoa1409838
