= 1976 Zaire Ebola virus outbreak =

Outbreak of Ebola virus disease

- Zaire (orthographic projection)
- Date: August–November 1976
- Deaths: Cases / Deaths: (as at end of outbreak); Zaire: 318 / 280

In August–November 1976, an outbreak of Ebola virus disease occurred in Zaire (now the Democratic Republic of the Congo). The first recorded case was from Yambuku, a small village in Mongala District, 1,098 kilometres (682 mi) northeast of the capital city of Kinshasa.

The virus responsible for the initial outbreak, named after the nearby Ebola River, was first thought to be Marburg virus but was later identified as a new type of virus related to the genus Marburgvirus.

A total of 318 cases and 280 deaths (an 88% fatality rate) resulted from this outbreak, which, along with an outbreak in today's South Sudan that had begun a few weeks previously, were the first outbreaks of Ebola ever recorded.

== History ==
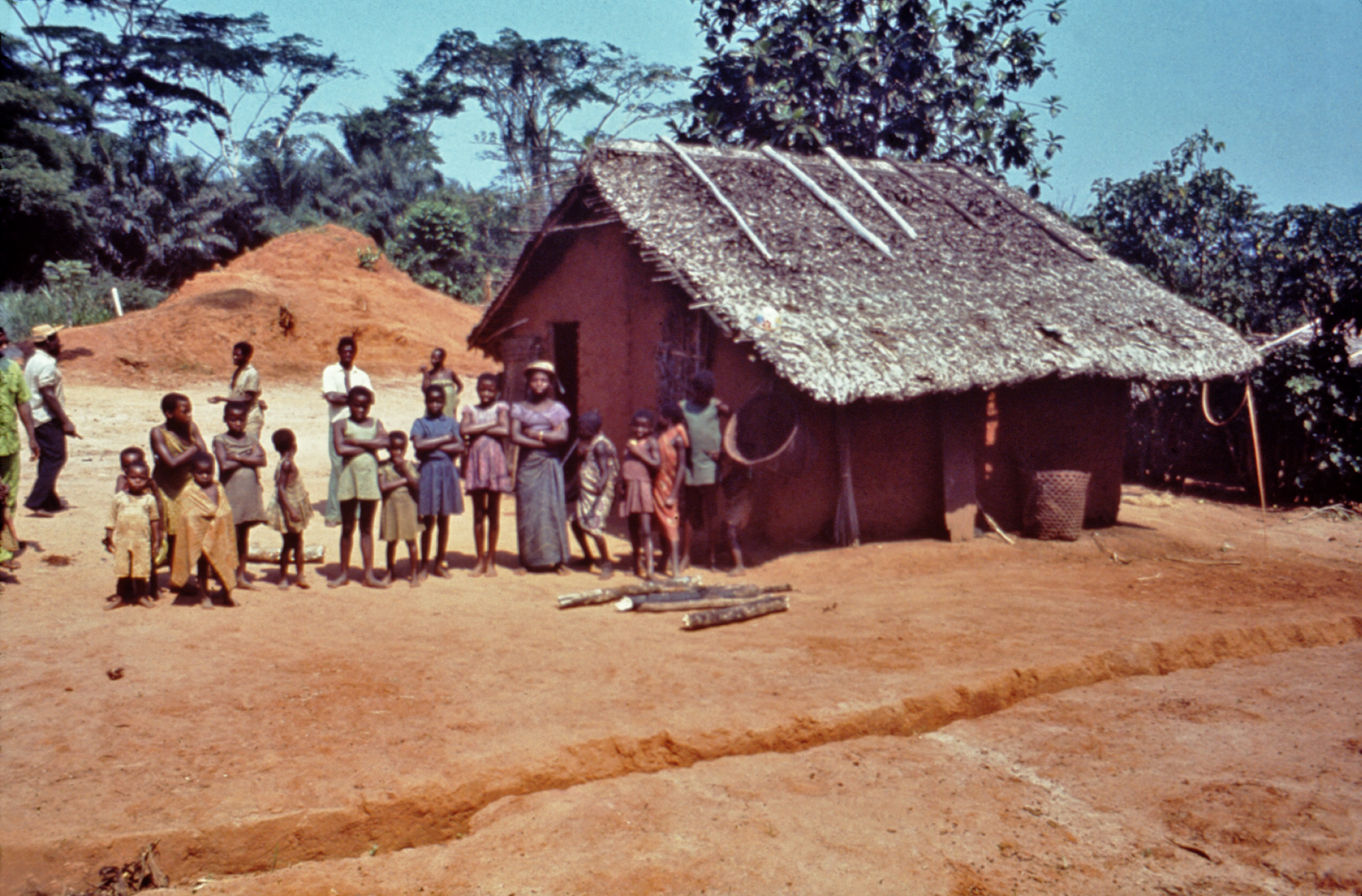
Residents being examined by CDC EIS officers during the Ebola outbreak of 1976

The people of north-central Zaire were most heavily affected by this specific epidemic. This area is located within the Bumba Zone in the Equator Region, which consists mostly of tropical rainforests in the biome. In 1976, there were approximately 275,000 people in the entire Bumba Zone, including 35,000 Zaireans.

75% of Zaire's population lived in forest villages at that time. Estimates suggest that each of the forest villages had a population of less than 5,000 people; the smallest villages had less than 500 inhabitants. Many of these villages bordered the Zaire River. The river runs along the border on the south side of the country, which was important in the context of the Ebola epidemic because it separated the areas geographically.

Most of Zaire's people either hunted or had contact with hunters that were exposed to an array of wild animals. This was considered a possible cause of the epidemic for some time; however, it probably was not. Because the cause of the outbreak was initially unknown, many people with Ebola virus disease were misdiagnosed and/or treated for malaria, yellow fever, and typhoid fever.

Mabalo Lokela, the headmaster of a local school in Yambuku, was the first case of the 1976 outbreak in Zaire. Lokela had toured with a Yambuku mission in August 1976 near the Central African Republic border and along the Ebola River. Initially, Lokela was diagnosed with malaria at the Yambuku Mission Hospital and was given quinine. However, Lokela returned to the mission hospital on 1 September with a high fever. Rest was recommended, and he returned home to his village of Yalikonde, about one kilometer from the mission complex. By 5 September, Lokela was in a critical condition with profuse bleeding from all orifices, vomiting, acute diarrhea, chest pains, headache, fever, agitation, and confusion. He died shortly afterwards on 8 September.

On 28 August, another man presented symptoms, claiming he was from the nearby village of Yandongi. He left the hospital on 30 August, as no clear cause could be identified from his symptoms, and was not seen again. On the same day, Yombe Ngongo, a patient at the hospital receiving treatment for anemia, checked out of the hospital and returned to her village. She soon fell seriously ill, and was tended to by her younger sister Euza. Yombe Ngongo died on 7 September, and her sister Euza followed on 9 September.

Soon after Lokela's visit, a number of other cases were presented at the Yambuku Mission Hospital. A report from the World Health Organization (WHO) noted that "almost all subsequent infections had either received injections at the hospital or had had close contact with another case." Shortly after family members had prepared his body for burial, in accordance with local customs, 21 of Lokela's friends and relatives all fell seriously ill and 18 later died.

Yambuku Mission Hospital was a remote Catholic hospital and had no doctors or laboratory facilities to aid in diagnosis. This, as well as a lack of communication capabilities, contributed to the hospital's isolation from Kinshasa. After the initial Ebola virus disease cases, the hospital was unable to get more resources until the Minister of Health sent out an International Commission to investigate further. Victims received treatment from four Belgian nuns, two Belgian priests, one female nurse from Zaire, and seven male Zaireians.

Urgent pleas for assistance were sent out on 12 September. On 15 September, the first doctor to arrive, Mgoi Mushola, prepared a report in which he noted that none of the many treatments provided met with success. This was the first formal description of Ebola virus disease.

== Epidemiology ==
The International Commission team worked with the nurses for interpreting and processing standardized pre-coded forms. These forms included clinical questionnaires, as well as many epidemiological features such as: asking for the sex and age of the person and asking to list out relatives that would also fill out a form. Through this form, the team was able to construct a control group to compare with the Ebola patients, by matching similar traits, thus helping them construct their epidemiological study.The team needed to figure out how this disease was spreading in order to make a plan of attack against the virus. Because of the uncertainty of the infection route, the team placed a quarantine over the region of the Bumba Zone that was most concerning within two days after the hospital's closure in October. The motivation for this quick quarantine was largely due to the intense nature of the symptoms and rapid progression of this disease. Unfortunately, there was a lot of resistance from people to help out the team and situation because of the fear associated with the unknown infection route of this disease. Since all of the infection route possibilities were in contention, they had to start narrowing down the potential infection pathways. The team noted that the cases had distinct patterns when drawn out into an epidemic curve that showed a clear correlation between the disease and women between the age of 18 and 25.

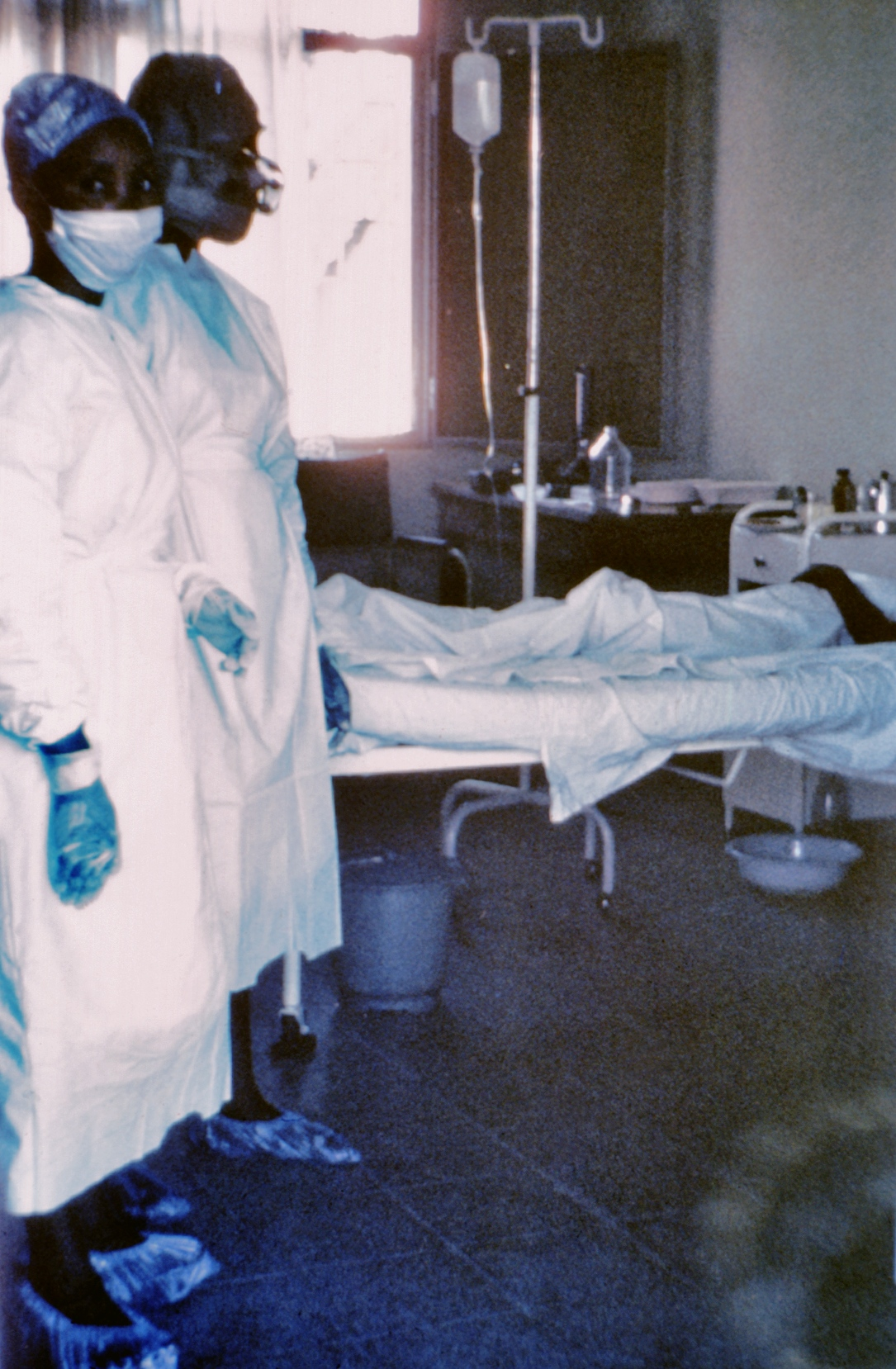
Two nurses treating Mayinga N'Seka, one of the early cases, in 1976

The Mission Hospital had only 120 beds available and a staff of just 17 nurses that were directed by a paramedical assistant, not a doctor. This hospital primarily saw patients from the Yandongi sector, but they had also attracted patients from the outer Bumba Zone because this hospital was considered relatively well-stocked and supplied with a good amount of staff for the area. They were already very limited in disease containment abilities because of these factors, but they also generally saw anywhere between 6,000 and 12,000 patients a month for general care. This is another reason why the quarantine was so necessary during the time of the Ebola epidemic at this hospital.

Peter Piot, a microbiologist and physician who investigated the ensuing epidemic, concluded that it was inadvertently caused by the Sisters of Yambuku Mission Hospital, who had given unnecessary vitamin injections to pregnant women in their prenatal clinic without sterilizing the needles and syringes. There were five total syringes and needles that were being used by this nursing staff for multiple days. These medical materials were rinsed between uses with the use of only warm water. Then, at the end of their shift, the nurses would boil the needles and syringes in water, and no other sterilization methods were utilized. This was not an effective enough sterilization process as the Ebola virus was able to be spread from an initial unidentified infected person and spread through this hospital. The International Commission team was able to back up this theory by their epidemiological study showing a correlation between injection history and Ebola cases and then consequently the spreading through person to person.

In all, 318 cases of Ebola were identified in Zaire, and 280 resulted in death. An additional 284 cases and 151 deaths occurred in nearby South Sudan in an unrelated outbreak. Yambuku Mission Hospital was closed after 11 of its 17 staff members died. Belgian nuns serving the community were also infected, and two of them died, along with Mayinga N'Seka, a Zairean nurse, after the group was transported to Kinshasa. With assistance from the WHO, the outbreak was eventually contained by quarantining local villagers in their communities, sterilizing medical equipment, and providing protective clothing to medical personnel. The small Zairian Air Force provided helicopters to allow the outbreak team to visit 550 villages in the area. Cases were documented in 55 of the 550 villages surveyed. The majority of cases were detected in the first four weeks of September, and the last detected probable case died on 5 November 1976.

The table below summarizes the eleven outbreaks that have occurred in the DRC since 1976:

Timeline of Ebola outbreaks in the Democratic Republic of the Congo (formerly Zaire) since 1976
^{V}^{・}^{T} Date	Country	Major location	Outbreak information				Source
^{V}^{・}^{T} Date	Country	Major location	Strain	Cases	Deaths	CFR	Source
Aug 1976	Zaire	Yambuku	EBOV	318	280	88%	
Jun 1977	Zaire	Tandala	EBOV	1	1	100%	
May–Jul 1995	Zaire	Kikwit	EBOV	315	254	81%	
Aug–Nov 2007	Democratic Republic of the Congo	Kasai-Occidental	EBOV	264	187	71%	
Dec 2008–Feb 2009	Democratic Republic of the Congo	Kasai-Occidental	EBOV	32	14	45%	
Jun–Nov 2012	Democratic Republic of the Congo	Orientale	BDBV	77	36	47%	
Aug–Nov 2014	Democratic Republic of the Congo	Tshuapa	EBOV	66	49	74%	
May–Jul 2017	Democratic Republic of the Congo	Likati	EBOV	8	4	50%	
Apr–Jul 2018	Democratic Republic of the Congo	Équateur Province	EBOV	54	33	61%	
Aug 2018–June 2020	Democratic Republic of the Congo	Kivu	EBOV	3,470	2,280	66%	
June–Nov 2020	Democratic Republic of the Congo	Équateur Province	EBOV	130	55	42%	
Feb 2021–May 2021	Democratic Republic of the Congo	North Kivu	EBOV	12	6	50%	
April 2022	Democratic Republic of the Congo	Équateur Province	EBOV	5	5	100%	
August 2022	Democratic Republic of the Congo	North Kivu	EBOV	1	1	100%	

== See also ==
- West African Ebola virus epidemic
- Ebola virus
- 1995 Kikwit Ebola outbreak
