= William Close =

American physician

- Born: William Taliaferro Close; June 7, 1924; Greenwich, Connecticut, U.S.
- Died: January 15, 2009 (aged 84); Big Piney, Wyoming, U.S.
- Education: Harvard University; Columbia University (MD)
- Spouse: Bettine Moore (m. 1943)
- Children: 5, including Glenn
- Relatives: Annie Starke (granddaughter)

William Taliaferro Close (June 7, 1924 – January 15, 2009) was an American surgeon who played a major role in stemming a 1976 outbreak of the Ebola virus in Zaire, the first major outbreak of the viral hemorrhagic fever in Central Africa, and preventing its further spread. He was also the father of Oscar-nominated actress Glenn Close and husband of Bettine Moore Close.

== Early life ==
William Close was born in Greenwich, Connecticut, on June 7, 1924, minutes after his twin brother Edward Jr. His parents were Elizabeth (née Taliaferro) and Edward Bennett Close, an attorney; his mother was a member of the Taliaferro family, one of the First Families of Virginia. William had two half-sisters, Adelaide Breevort (Close) Riggs and Eleanor Post Close (Eleanor Post Hutton), from his father's first marriage to Post Cereals heiress and General Foods owner Marjorie Merriweather Post.

Raised in France, he attended Summer Fields School, Harrow School in England, and then St. Paul's School in Concord, New Hampshire. Close enrolled in Harvard College in 1941, leaving the school two years later to marry and to become a pilot in the U.S. Army Air Corps during World War II. He served as the personal pilot and interpreter for General Joseph Harper.

Following his military service, he attended the Columbia University College of Physicians and Surgeons, and he trained in surgery at Roosevelt Hospital in Manhattan after receiving his medical degree.

== Career ==
In 1960, he traveled to the Belgian Congo, where he practiced medicine, being the only surgeon in Leopoldville during the Belgian revolutions. He met and befriended a young Congolese soldier named Mobutu, and after Mobutu became president, he agreed to run the 1,500-bed Mama Yemo Hospital (now Kinshasa General Hospital) named in honor of Mobutu's mother, in the capital city of Kinshasa, Zaire, with the goal of getting health care into rural areas of the country. He served President Mobutu Sese Seko as his personal physician, pilot, director of security, and was Surgeon General of the nation's army. He developed a hospital ship that traveled the Congo, bringing medical care, and, more importantly, medical education to remote village healers. Medical research at the Mama Yemo Hospital was very important to the understanding of the HIV-AIDS disease, and changed the worldwide practice of always repeating C-Section deliveries.

In the mid-1970s, the Ebola virus broke out at a missionary hospital in rural Yambuku, near the Ebola River. The disease, which was characterized by severe sore throat, rash, abdominal pain, and bleeding from multiple sites, had killed 11 of the 17 medical staff at the hospital, forcing it to close. Panic was in the air, with roads blocked, river traffic stopped, and commercial air travel restricted. The army would not enter the area and President Mobutu was said to have left the country and fled to France, in the face of fears that the disease could spread to others, as those infected with the disease tried to escape the center of the outbreak.

On his way back home to the United States for a home leave, Dr. Close returned to Kinshasa from Geneva, discussing the issue on the flight with two physicians from the Centers for Disease Control (CDC), Joel G. Breman and Peter Piot, who discovered the Ebola virus. Back in Zaire, Close obtained airplanes and pilots from the Ministry of Health to transport medical equipment to the affected area, using his personal connection to President Mobutu to obtain the access he needed. Close coordinated efforts in the area, ensuring that medical supplies were directed to where they were most needed. After providing protective equipment for hospital workers, sterilizing medical supplies, and quarantining patients, the team was able to break the chain of transmission of the virus, with almost 90% of the 318 people infected left dead.

Blood samples that Close had collected in the 1970s were used to investigate the progress of the AIDS pandemic, showing that the rate of infection had been stable at 0.8% by comparing new samples to the older ones that had been collected in Zaire, one of the few sets of historical specimens available to perform this analysis. This showed that HIV infection rates could have been stable in rural Africa before it spread throughout the world.

=== Last years ===
Disillusioned with Mobutu's policies, Close left Zaire in 1977. He moved to Big Piney, Wyoming, where he became a country doctor, making his final house call a month before his death. During the 1995 Ebola outbreak, he was a liaison between the CDC and the Zairian government. Close wrote four books, which included chronicles of his experiences as a doctor in Zaire and Wyoming.

== Personal life ==
On February 6, 1943, Close married Bettine Moore (1924–2015) in a ceremony held at the home of her parents in Greenwich. She was the daughter of Elizabeth Hyde (1897–1983) and Charles Arthur Moore Jr. (1880–1949). Together they had four children: Tina, Glenn, Alexander, and Jessie.

Close died of a heart attack on January 15, 2009, in his home in Big Piney. He was 84.

== Honors and accolades ==
- Fellow, American College of Surgeons
- Fellow, American Academy of Family Physicians
- Honorary degree: Doctor of Humane Letters (University of Utah, 2001)

== Books ==
- Zuster Veronica, Het drama van Yambuku (Dutch: "Sister Veronica, The Tragedy of Yambuku") (1991), Uitgeverij De Fontein, Baarn.
  - Ebola: A Documentary Novel of Its First Explosion in Zaire by a Doctor who was There [English version] (1995), New York: Ballantine Books.
  - Ebola: Through the Eyes of the People (2002), Expanded, revised edition, Marbleton, Wyoming: Meadowlarks Springs Productions. Illustrations by Itoko Maeno.
- A Doctor's Story: From City Surgeon to Country "Doc" (1996), Ivy Books (and Ballantine Books paperback)
  - A Doctor's Life: Unique Stories (2001), Expanded, revised version, Marbleton, Wyoming: Meadowlarks Springs Productions.
- Subversion of Trust (2002), Marbleton, Wyoming: Meadowlarks Springs Productions [a novel].
- Beyond the Storm: Treating the Powerless and the Powerful in Mobutu's Congo/Zaire (2006), with [Malonga Miatudila], Marbleton, Wyoming: Meadowlarks Springs Productions.
