= Birth Defects Research =

- Discipline: Obstetrics and gynaecology
- Language: English
- Edited by: Michel Vekemans

Publication details
- Former name(s): Teratology
- Publisher: Wiley
- Frequency: 20/year
- Impact factor: 2.344 (2020)

Standard abbreviations
- ISO 4: Birth Defects Res.

Indexing
- CODEN: BDRIDA
- ISSN: 2472-1727

Links
- Journal homepage; Online archive

Birth Defects Research is a peer-reviewed academic journal of birth defects published by Wiley on behalf of the Society for Birth Defects Research and Prevention, which was established in 1960 as the Teratology Society. It is in its 111th volume. The editor is Michel Vekemans.

The journal was founded in 1968 under the name Teratology, which was published quarterly from 1968 to 1971, bimonthly from 1972 to 1987, and monthly from 1988 onward. It merged in 2003 with the journal Teratogenesis, Carcinogenesis, and Mutagenesis (which was established in 1980) and given the name Birth Defects Research Part A - Clinical and Molecular Teratology. In January 2017, the journal was merged with Birth Defects Research Part B and Birth Defects Research Part C and given its present name Birth Defects Research. The Journal is the official publication of the Society for Birth Defects Research and Prevention.

According to the Journal Citation Reports, the journal has a 2020 impact factor of 2.344.
