= Ian Crozier =

American physician (born 1970/1)

- Born: 1970 or 1971 (age 55–56); Fort Victoria, Rhodesia
- Occupation: Physician
- Known for: Surviving Ebola

Ian Crozier is an American physician who contracted Ebola virus disease in September 2014, while working in West Africa.

== Early life ==
Crozier was born in 1970 or 1971 in the Rhodesian city of Fort Victoria. His family moved to the United States when he was ten years old. He attended Vanderbilt University, earning his M.D. in 1997, and also completed his training in internal medicine and infectious disease at Vanderbilt.

Crozier later moved to Uganda to train doctors in Kampala in treating people with HIV.

== Ebola virus disease ==
Crozier volunteered with the World Health Organization at the Ebola Treatment Unit in Kenema, Sierra Leone beginning in August 2014.

Crozier first began experiencing symptoms of Ebola on September 6. On September 9, he was evacuated by the WHO to Emory University Hospital in Atlanta, becoming the third American to be transported there to be treated for Ebola. He remained there for forty days—the longest stay of any ebola patient in the United States—before being released on October 19, 2014. His condition was considered to be worse than the other patients, and he was treated with renal dialysis and plasma from a nurse who had recovered from the disease. In December 2014, he revealed his identity publicly in an interview with The New York Times. He said the reason he wanted to speak out was to thank Emory University for the medical care he received while he was a patient there, and to draw attention to the then-ongoing outbreak. In May 2015, it was discovered that the Ebola virus could still be found in Crozier's eye despite the fact that it had not been detectable in his blood for months.
