= Dorothy H. Crawford =

Scottish microbiologist

Dorothy H. Crawford FRSE OBE is professor of medical microbiology and assistant principal for public understanding of medicine at the University of Edinburgh. She has written a number of books on viruses.

== Selected publications ==
- The Invisible Enemy: A Natural History of Viruses. Oxford University Press, Oxford, 2002.
- Virus Hunt. Oxford University Press, Oxford, 2013.
- Deadly Companions. Oxford University Press, Oxford, 2018.
- Viruses: A Very Short Introduction. Oxford University Press, Oxford, 2018.
