= Ebola River =

River in Democratic Republic of the Congo

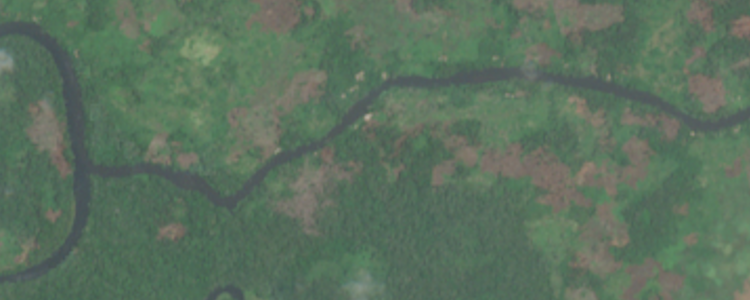

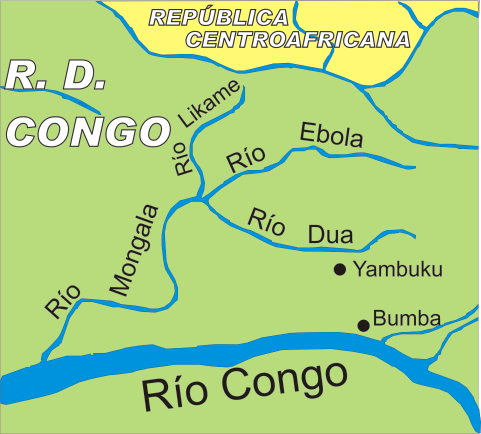
- Native name: Legbala (Northern Ngbandi)

Location
- Country: Democratic Republic of the Congo

Physical characteristics
- Mouth: Mongala River
  - coordinates: 3°19′24″N 20°57′38″E
- Length: 250 km (160 mi)

The Ebola River (/iˌboʊlə/ or /əˈboʊlə/), also commonly known by its Ngbandi name Legbala, is the headstream of the Mongala River, a tributary of the Congo River, in northern Democratic Republic of the Congo. It is roughly 250 kilometers (160 mi) in length.

The name Ebola is a French corruption of Legbala, its name in Ngbandi which means 'white water'. During the Belgian administration these names were interchangeable along with the French names Eau Blanche and rarely L'Ébola.

In 1976, Ebola virus was first identified in Yambuku, 111 kilometers (69 mi) from the Ebola River, but the virologist Karl Johnson decided to name it after the river so that the town would not be associated with the disease's stigma. Thus, the river is eponymous to the terms Ebola virus, Ebolavirus, and Ebola virus disease (usually referred to as simply "Ebola").
