= Yambuku =

- Village
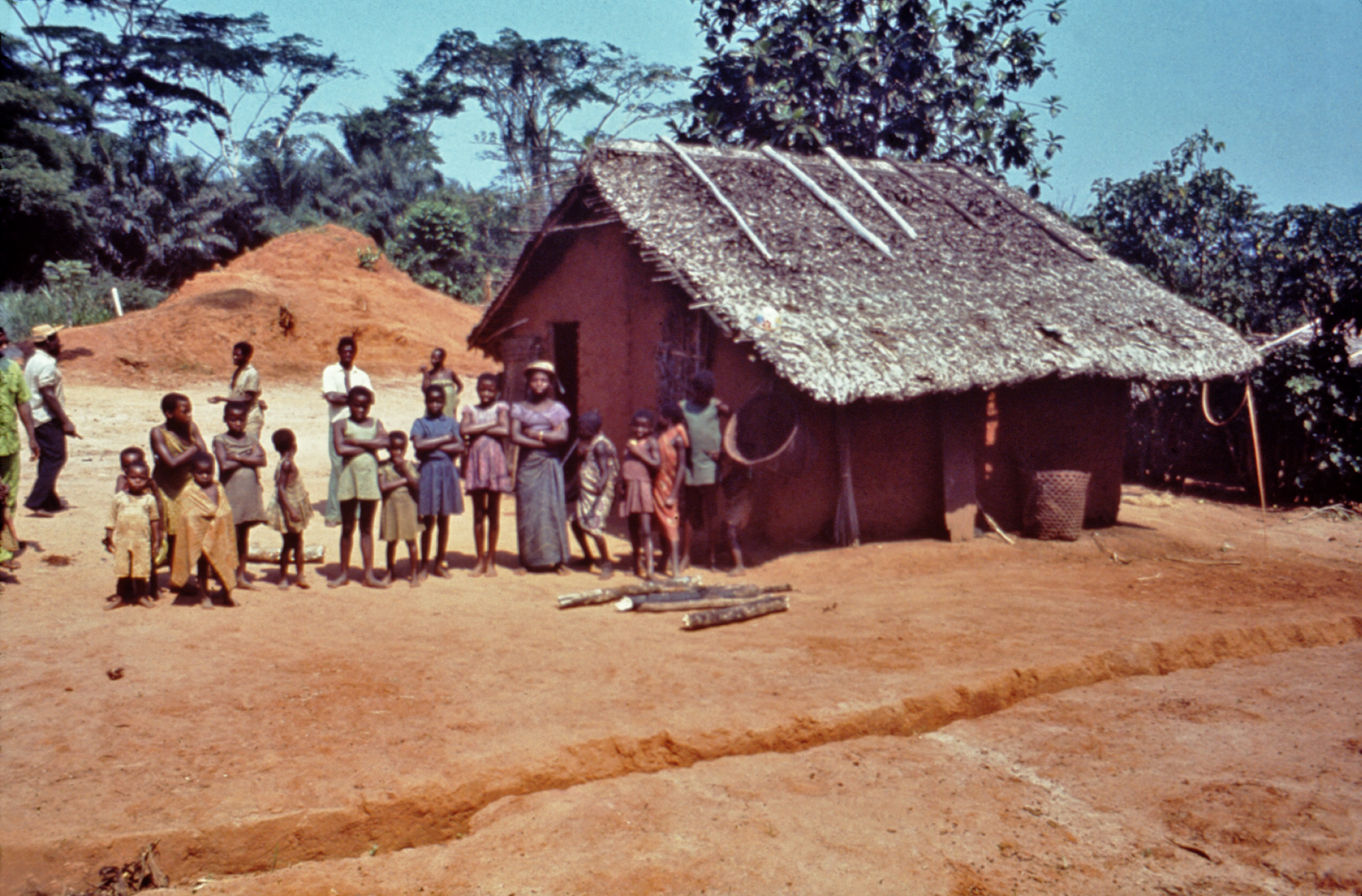
- Yambuku homes in 1976

- Location within Democratic Republic of the Congo
- Coordinates: 2°49′23″N 22°13′28″E
- Country: Democratic Republic of the Congo
- Province: Mongala
- Territory: Bumba
- Sector: Yandongi
- Grouping: Yambuku

Yambuku is a small village in Mongala Province in northern Democratic Republic of the Congo. It was the center of the first documented outbreak of Ebola virus disease, in 1976, with the World Health Organization identifying a man from Yambuku as the index case. It is 1,098 kilometres (682 mi) northeast of the capital city of Kinshasa.

During the 1976 Zaire Ebola virus outbreak, the village had no running water or electricity. The village had a hospital but no radio, phone, or ambulances, and communication was only by motorbike messenger.

== See also ==
- Western African Ebola virus epidemic
- Zaire ebolavirus
