= List of Ebola outbreaks =

Cases and outbreaks of Ebola virus disease

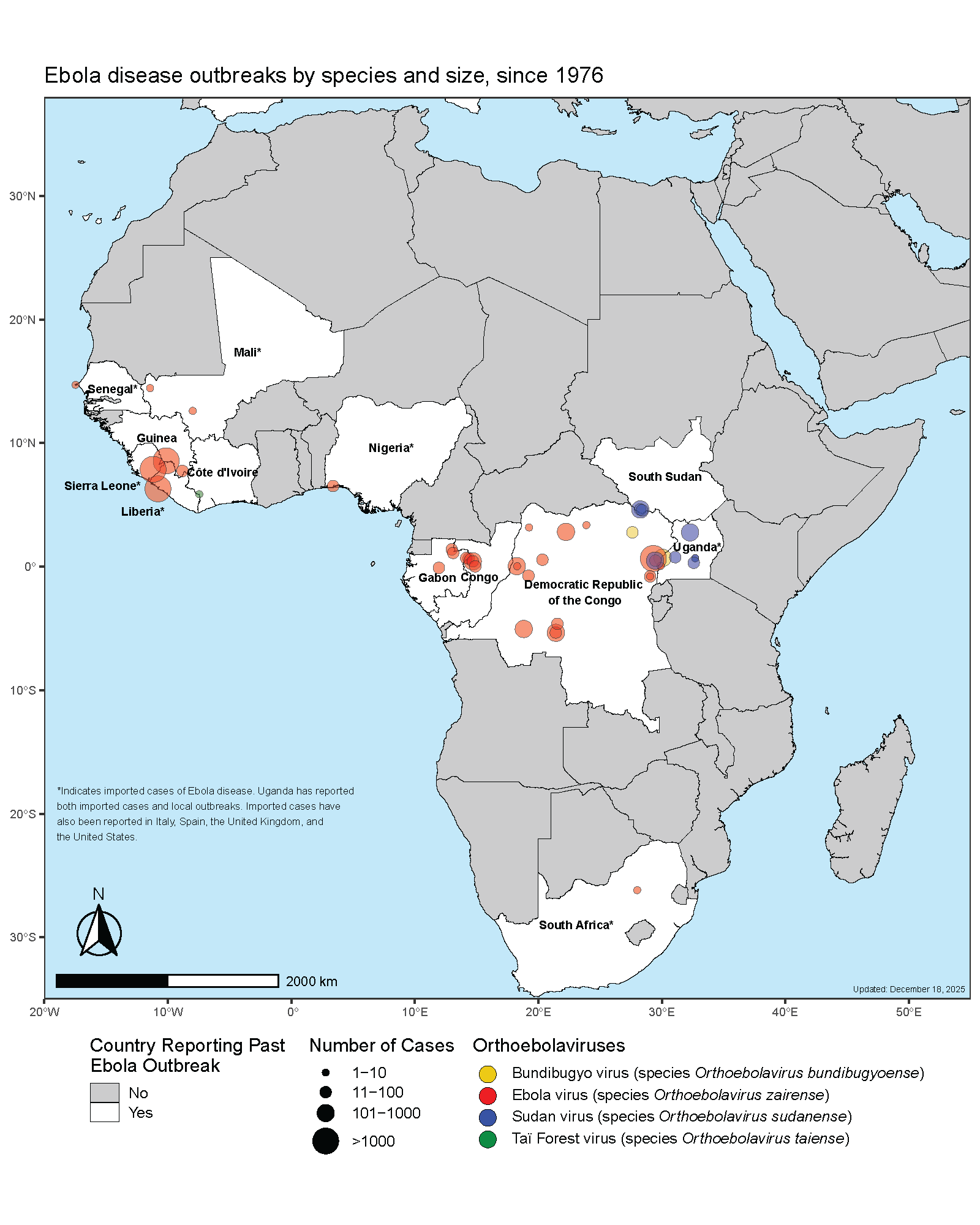
Ebola outbreaks have occurred throughout western and central Africa, 1976-2025

This list of Ebola outbreaks records the known occurrences of Ebola virus disease, a highly infectious and acutely lethal viral disease that has afflicted humans and animals primarily in equatorial Africa. The pathogens responsible for the disease are the five ebolaviruses recognized by the International Committee on Taxonomy of Viruses: Ebola virus (EBOV), Sudan virus (SUDV), Reston virus (RESTV), Taï Forest virus (TAFV), and Bundibugyo virus (BDBV). Four of the five variants have caused the disease in humans as well as other animals; RESTV has caused clinical symptoms only in non-human primates. RESTV has caused subclinical infections in humans, producing an antibody response but no visual symptoms or disease state manifestations.

Transmission of ebolaviruses between natural reservoirs and humans is rare, and outbreaks of Ebola virus disease are often traceable to a single case where an individual has handled the carcass of a gorilla, chimpanzee, bats, or duiker. The virus then spreads person-to-person, especially within families, in hospitals, and during some mortuary rituals where contact among individuals becomes more likely.

Learning from failed responses, such as during the 2000 outbreak in Uganda, the World Health Organization (WHO) established its Global Outbreak Alert and Response Network, and other public health measures were instituted in areas at high risk. Field laboratories were established to confirm cases, instead of shipping samples to South Africa. Outbreaks are also closely monitored by the United States Centers for Disease Control and Prevention (CDC) Special Pathogens Branch.

Nigeria was the first country in western Africa to successfully curtail the virus, and its procedures have served as a model for other countries to follow.

== Events ==
The information in the following tables comes from the World Health Organization (WHO). This data excludes all laboratory personnel cases, Reston virus cases (since they are all asymptomatic), and suspected cases. For a complete overview, those cases are included below with footnotes and supporting sources.

=== Major or massive cases ===
Date	Country (Note: In accordance with the sovereignty at the time.)	Virus	Human cases	Human deaths	CFR/Case fatality rate	Description
Jun–Nov 1976	Sudan	Sudan virus (SUDV)	284	151	53%	Occurred in Nzara (the source town), Maridi, Tumbura, and Juba (cities in present-day South Sudan). The index cases were workers in a cotton factory. The disease was spread by close contact with an acute case, usually from patients to their nurses. Many medical care personnel were infected.
Aug–Nov 1976	Zaire	Zaire virus (EBOV) (Mayinga)	318	280	88%	Main article: 1976 Zaire Ebola virus outbreak Occurred in Yambuku and surrounding areas in what was then Zaire (present-day Democratic Republic of the Congo DRC). It spread through personal contact and by use of contaminated needles and syringes in hospitals and clinics.
Aug–Sep 1979	Sudan	SUDV	34	22	65%	Occurred in Nzara and Maridi. This was a recurrent outbreak at the same site as the 1976 Sudan epidemic.
Dec 1994–Feb 1995	Gabon	EBOV	52	31	60%	Occurred in Makokou and gold-mining camps deep in the rainforest along the Ivindo River. Until 1995, the outbreak was incorrectly classified as yellow fever.
May–Jul 1995	Zaire	Zaire virus (EBOV) (Kikwit)	315	254	81%	Occurred in Kikwit and surrounding areas. The outbreak was traced to a patient who worked in a forest adjoining the city. The epidemic spread through families and hospital admissions.
Jan 1996–Mar 1997	Gabon	Zaire virus (EBOV) (Ebov-1996a and Ebov-1996b)	91	66	72.53%	The first strain occurred in the village of Mayibout 2 and neighboring areas. A chimpanzee found dead in the forest was eaten by villagers hunting for food. Nineteen people involved in the butchery of the animal became ill, and other cases occurred in their family members. The last strain Occurred in the Booué area with transport of patients to Libreville. The index case-patient was a hunter who lived in a forest timber camp. The disease was spread by close contact with infected persons. A dead chimpanzee found in the forest at the time was determined to be infected.
Oct 2000–Jan 2001	Uganda	Sudan virus (SUDV)	425	224	53%	Occurred in the Gulu, Masindi, and Mbarara districts of Uganda. The three greatest risks associated with Sudan virus infection were attending funerals of case-patients, having contact with case-patients in one's family, and providing medical care to case-patients without using adequate personal protective measures. Victims included Matthew Lukwiya.
Oct 2001–Dec 2003	Gabon; ROC	Zaire virus (EBOV) (Ebov-2001a and Ebov-2003)	302	254	84.11%	The first strain Occurred on both sides of the border between Gabon and the Republic of the Congo (RC). This outbreak included the first reported occurrence of Ebola virus disease in the RC. The second strain Occurred in the districts of Mbomo and Kelle in the Cuvette-Ouest Department. The third strain Occurred in Mbomo and Mbandza villages, located in Mbomo District in the Cuvette-Ouest Department.
Apr–Jun 2004	Sudan	Sudan virus (SUDV)	17	7	41%	Occurred in Yambio county in Western Equatoria of southern Sudan (present-day South Sudan). This outbreak was concurrent with an outbreak of measles in the same area, and several suspected EVD cases were reclassified later as measles cases.
Apr-May 2005	ROC	Zaire virus (EBOV)	12	10	83%	Occurred in the Etoumbi district of Cuvette Ouest Department of the Republic of the Congo
Aug–Nov 2007	DRC	Zaire virus (EBOV) (Ebov-2007)	264	187	71%	Outbreak was declared in September in Luebo and Mweke health zones of the Kasaï-Occidental province.
Dec 2007–Jan 2008	Uganda	Bundibugyo virus (BDBV)	149	37	25%	Occurred in the Bundibugyo District in western Uganda. This was the first identification of the Bundibugyo virus (BDBV).
Dec 2008–Feb 2009	DRC	EBOV	32	14	45%	Occurred in the Mweka and Luebo health zones of the Kasaï-Occidental province.
Jun–Aug 2012	Uganda	Sudan virus (SUDV)	24	17	71%	Occurred in the Kibaale District.
Jun–Nov 2012	DRC	Bundibugyo virus (BDBV)	57	29	51%	Occurred in the Orientale Province.
Dec 2013–Jun 2016	Widespread: Liberia; Sierra Leone; Guinea; Limited and local: Nigeria; Mali; United States; Senegal; Spain; United Kingdom; Italy	Zaire virus (EBOV) (Makona)	28,616	11,310	70–71% (general) (Note: The mortality rate (death/case ratio) recorded in Liberia up to 26 August 2014 was 70 percent. However, the general estimated case fatality rate (70.8 percent) for this ongoing epidemic differs from the ratio of the number of deaths divided by that of cases due to the estimation method used. Current infections have not run their course, and the estimate may be poor if reporting is biased towards severe cases.); 57–59% (among hospitalized patients)	Main article: Western African Ebola epidemic This was the most severe Ebola outbreak in recorded history in regards to both the number of human cases and fatalities. It began in Guéckédou, Guinea, in December 2013 and spread abroad. Flare-ups of the disease continued into 2016, and the outbreak was declared over on 9 June 2016.
Aug–Nov 2014	DRC	Zaire virus (EBOV)	66	49	74%	Main article: 2014 Democratic Republic of the Congo Ebola outbreak Occurred in Équateur province. Outbreak detected 24 August and, as of 28 October 2014, the WHO said that twenty days had passed since the last reported case was discharged and no new contacts were being followed. Declared over on 15 November 2014.
May–Jul 2018	DRC	Zaire virus (EBOV) (Ebov-2018a)	54	33	61%	Main article: 2018 Équateur Province Ebola outbreak On 8 May 2018, the government of the Democratic Republic of the Congo reported two confirmed cases of Ebola infection in the northwestern town of Bikoro. On 17 May, a case was confirmed in the city of Mbandaka. Health authorities were planning to ring vaccinate with rVSV-ZEBOV, a recently developed experimental Ebola vaccine, to contain the outbreak. The outbreak was ongoing as of 24 June 2018, in 2014 a different area of Equateur province was affected On 24 July 2018 the outbreak was declared over.
Aug 2018–Jun 2020	Widespread: DRC; Limited and local: Uganda	Zaire virus (EBOV) (Ebov-2018b)	3,470	2,280	66%	Main article: Kivu Ebola epidemic On 1 August 2018, the Democratic Republic of the Congo Ministry of Health declared an outbreak when 4 individuals tested positive for the Ebola virus. On 11 June 2019, the WHO confirmed that a five-year-old boy in Uganda died after being diagnosed with Ebola. On 25 June 2020, the then second biggest recorded EVD outbreak was declared over.
May 2020–Nov 2020	DRC	Zaire virus (EBOV) (Ebov-2020)	130	55	42%	Main article: 2020 Équateur Province Ebola outbreak On 31 May 2020, the DRC Health Minister Eteni Longondo announced an additional Ebola outbreak, separate to the ongoing Kivu Ebola epidemic. The outbreak originated in Équateur province (which was also the location of the 2018 Équateur province Ebola outbreak). By 17 October 2020, the case count was 128 with 53 fatalities. By 18 November 2020, the World Health Organization and the Congolese government had not received reports of any cases of Ebola in Équateur province or all of the DRC for 42 days. When the outbreak was declared over, there were 130 reported cases and 55 reported fatalities due to the virus.
Feb–May 2021	DRC	Zaire virus (EBOV)	12	6	50%	On 6 February 2021, an outbreak was declared in Butembo in the North Kivu province by the Ministry of Public Health of the Democratic Republic of the Congo. By 3 May 2021, the outbreak was declared over.
Feb–Jun 2021	Guinea	Zaire virus (EBOV) (r2021)	23	12	52%	First Ebola cases and deaths in the country since 2016. The first cases were confirmed on 14 February 2021, and by 9 April 2021, there were 23 reported cases of the virus, with 12 fatalities and 9 recoveries. Scientists concluded that the likely source of the outbreak was a man who had survived the 2013-2016 West African epidemic but had unknowingly harbored the Ebola virus in his body, eventually transmitting it to somebody in his community, although the first known case of this current outbreak was a female nurse who had died on 28 January 2021. The outbreak was declared over on 19 June 2021.
Oct–Dec 2021	DRC	Zaire virus (EBOV)	11	9	82%	On 8 October 2021, the Ministry of Public Health for the Democratic Republic of the Congo reported a new laboratory confirmed case of Ebola virus disease, ten more related cases were later confirmed. On 16 December the outbreak was declared over.
Sept 2022–Jan 2023	Uganda	Sudan virus (SUDV)	164	77	47%	Main article: 2022–2023 Uganda Ebola outbreak On 20 September 2022 an outbreak was declared in Mubende District, Uganda. Seventy-seven people died, with a total of 164 cases detected. The outbreak was declared over in January 2023.
Feb–Apr 2025	Uganda	Sudan virus (SUDV)	14	4	29%	Main article: 2025 Uganda Ebola outbreak On 1 February 2025, Uganda confirmed an outbreak. On 6 February CDC released a travel advisory, because of cases in Kampala, Mbale, and Wakiso. By 7 March, 14 cases and four deaths had been confirmed. On 26 April 2025, the Ugandan health ministry declared the end of the outbreak.
Aug 2025–Dec 2025	DRC	Zaire virus (EBOV) (EBOV/Kasai-2025)	64	43	67.2%	Main article: 2025 Kasaï Province Ebola outbreak An outbreak of the Zaire ebolavirus (EBOV) was declared by the Ministry of Public Health in Kasai Province on 4 September 2025.
May 2026–present	Widespread: DRC; Limited and local: Uganda; Kenya; Nigeria France	Bundibugyo virus (BDBV)	11,711	5,719	48.8%	Main article: 2026 Ebola epidemic In May 2026, an epidemic of Bundibugyo virus was reported in the Ituri Province of the Democratic Republic of the Congo and Kampala in Uganda.

=== Minor or single cases ===
Date	Country	Virus	Human cases	Human deaths	Description
1976	United Kingdom	SUDV or EBOV (Note: The Centers for Disease Control chronology notes this infection as "Sudan virus", whereas the 1977 British Medical Journal (BMJ) article refers to it as "Ebola virus". In 1977, there was no distinction between different ebolaviruses. The BMJ article notes only that the patient received "convalescent serum from the Sudan" following similar serum from Zaire)	1	0	Laboratory infection by accidental stick of contaminated needle.
1977	Zaire	EBOV	1	1	Noted retroactively in the village of Tandala.
1989–1990	Philippines	RESTV	3 (Note: All cases were asymptomatic.)	0	The Reston virus (RESTV) was first identified when it caused high mortality in crab-eating macaques in a primate research facility responsible for exporting animals to the United States. Three workers in the facility developed antibodies to the virus but did not get sick.
1989	United States	RESTV	0	0	RESTV was introduced into quarantine facilities in Virginia and Pennsylvania by monkeys imported from the Philippines. No human cases were reported.
1990	United States	RESTV	4	0	Monkeys imported from the Philippines introduced RESTV into quarantine facilities in Virginia and Texas. Four humans developed antibodies but did not get sick.
1992	Italy	RESTV	0	0	RESTV was introduced into quarantine facilities in Siena by monkeys imported from the same facility in the Philippines that was the source of the 1989 and 1990 U.S. outbreaks. No human cases resulted.
1994	Côte d'Ivoire (Note: The case was repatriated to Switzerland for medical treatment.)	TAFV	1	0	This case was the first and thus far only recognition of Taï Forest virus (TAFV). Approximately one week after conducting necropsies on infected western chimpanzees in Taï National Park, a scientist contracted the virus and developed symptoms similar to those of dengue fever. She was discharged from a Swiss hospital two weeks later and fully recovered after six weeks.
1995	Côte d'Ivoire	Unknown	1	0	One person, fleeing the civil war in neighboring Liberia, was identified as an Ebola case in Gozon. This is considered as a suspected case, excluding from the WHO outbreak counts.
1996	South Africa	EBOV	1	1	n/a
1996	United States	RESTV	0	0	RESTV was again introduced into a quarantine facility in Texas by monkeys imported from the same facility in the Philippines that was the source of the 1989 and 1990 U.S. outbreaks. No human cases resulted.
1996	Philippines	RESTV	0	0	RESTV was identified at a monkey export facility in the Philippines. No human cases resulted.
1996	Russia	EBOV	1	1	Laboratory contamination.
2004	Russia	EBOV	1	1	Laboratory contamination.
2008	Philippines	RESTV	6	0	First recognition of RESTV in pigs. Strain very similar to earlier strains. Occurred in November. Six workers from the pig farm and slaughterhouse developed antibodies but did not become sick.
2011	Uganda	SUDV	1	1	A 12 year old girl from Luwero District in central Uganda.
2012	Uganda	SUDV	7	4	Occurred in the Luweero and Kampala districts of Uganda in November and December 2012
2015	Philippines	RESTV	0	0	On 6 September 2015, the Philippine health secretary reported an outbreak of RESTV in a primate research and breeding facility. Twenty-five workers subsequently tested negative for the virus.
2017	DRC	EBOV	8	4	Main article: 2017 Democratic Republic of the Congo Ebola virus outbreak On 11 May 2017, the Ministry of Public Health for the Democratic Republic of the Congo notified the WHO of an Ebola outbreak in the Likati health zone (LHZ) in Bas-Uele province, in the northern part of the country. Suspected infections were reported from Nambwa, Mouma, and Ngay. The LHZ borders the Central African Republic, which made this outbreak a moderate risk to the region.
2018	Hungary	N/A	0	0	On 20 April 2018, a laboratory accident led to a single worker being exposed to the Ebola virus, though he did not develop symptoms.
2022	DRC	EBOV	5	5	An outbreak in DRC began on April 23, and killed 100% of those infected.
2022	DRC	EBOV	1	1	A single case was confirmed in North Kivu.

=== List of other Filoviridae outbreaks ===
Marburg virus disease outbreaks
Year	Country	Virus	Human cases	Human deaths	Case fatality rate	Comments
1967	West Germany; Yugoslavia	MARV	31	7	23%	Main article: 1967 Marburg virus disease outbreak In 1967 outbreaks in Marburg, Germany where the virus was first identified (historically) and the subsequent naming of the virus per the location
1975	Rhodesia; South Africa	MARV	3	1	33%	Individual had traveled to Zimbabwe
1980	Kenya	MARV	2	1	50%	Individual(s) traveled to Kitum Cave
1987	Kenya	RAVV	1	1	100%	Ravn virus (RAVV) one of two members of the species Marburg marburgvirus
1990	Soviet Union	MARV	1	1	100%	Laboratory incident
1998–2000	DRC	MARV & RAVV	154	128	83%	Occurred in Durba
2004–2005	Angola	MARV	252	227	90%	Largest Marburg virus outbreak ever occurred in Angola
2007	Uganda	MARV & RAVV	4	1	25%	Occurred in Kamwenge
2008	Uganda; Netherlands; United States	MARV	2	1	50%	-
2012	Uganda	MARV	15	4	27%	Occurred in Kabale
2014	Uganda	MARV	1	1	100%	-
2017	Uganda	MARV	3	3	100%	Main article: 2017 Uganda Marburg virus outbreak Uganda has had five outbreaks of the virus
2021	Guinea	MARV	1	1	100%	Main article: 2021 Guinea Marburg virus disease outbreak In August 2021, two months after the re-emergent Ebola epidemic in the Guéckédou prefecture was declared over, a case of the Marburg virus disease was confirmed by health authorities through laboratory analysis. This is the first-ever case of the Marburg virus disease in West Africa. On August 2, the patient succumbed to the illness.
2022	Ghana	MARV	3	3	100%	Main article: 2022 Ghana Marburg virus disease outbreak First time Ghana has had cases of Marburg virus disease
2023	Equatorial Guinea	MARV	17	12	70%	Main article: 2023 Equatorial Guinea Marburg virus disease outbreak First time Marburg virus disease was detected in the country.
2023	Tanzania	MARV	9	6	67%	Main article: 2023 Tanzania Marburg virus disease outbreak First time Marburg virus disease was detected in the country.
2024	Rwanda	MARV	66	15	23%	Main article: Rwanda Marburg virus disease outbreak First time Marburg virus disease was detected in the country
2025	Ethiopia	MARV	14	9	64%	Main article: 2025–26 Ethiopian Marburg virus disease outbreak First time Marburg virus disease was detected in the country.

== See also ==
- Ebola
- Ebola River
- Globalization and disease
- List of epidemics
