= Bombali ebolavirus =

Virus classification
- (unranked): Virus
- Realm: Riboviria
- Kingdom: Orthornavirae
- Phylum: Negarnaviricota
- Class: Monjiviricetes
- Order: Mononegavirales
- Family: Filoviridae
- Genus: Orthoebolavirus
- Species: Bombali ebolavirus

Synonyms
- Bombali virus

Species of virus

Bombali ebolavirus or Bombali virus (BOMV) is a species of the genus Orthoebolavirus, first reported on 27 July 2018. It was discovered and sequenced by a PREDICT research team from the U.S. in the Bombali area in the north of Sierra Leone, west Africa. The virus was found in the Angolan free-tailed bat and the Little free-tailed bat.

In 2019, the virus was demonstrated in Angolan free-tailed bats in southeast Kenya and southeast Guinea. Bombali ebolavirus has the capacity to infect human cells, although it has not yet been shown to be pathogenic.

The team reporting the virus also published its full genome sequence (NC_039345).

== See also ==
- Zaire ebolavirus
