= 2025 Uganda Ebola outbreak =

Disease outbreak in East Africa

- Disease: Ebola
- Pathogen: Sudan ebolavirus
- Location: Uganda
- Date: 30 January 2025 – 26 April 2025
- Confirmed cases: 14
- Deaths: 4

An outbreak of the Sudan ebolavirus (SUDV) was declared by the Ugandan Ministry of Health on 30 January 2025 and was lifted on 26 April 2025. It is Uganda's sixth outbreak of Sudan Virus Disease.

== Background ==
Uganda has previously had five outbreaks of Sudan ebolavirus (SUDV). The three other outbreaks of SUDV occurred in Sudan. Uganda has also had two outbreaks of other Ebola variants; one of Bundibugyo virus disease (BDBV) and one of Zaire ebolavirus (EBOV).

| Date | Virus | Human cases | Human deaths | CFR | Description |
|---|---|---|---|---|---|
| Oct 2000–Jan 2001 | SUDV | 425 | 224 | 53% | Occurred in the Gulu, Masindi, and Mbarara districts of Uganda. The three greatest risks associated with Sudan virus infection were attending funerals of case-patients, having contact with case-patients in one's family, and providing medical care to case-patients without using adequate personal protective measures. Victims included Matthew Lukwiya. |
| 2011 | SUDV | 1 | 1 | 100% | A 12-year-old girl from Luweero District in central Uganda. |
| 2011–Aug 2012 | SUDV | 32 | 22 | 69% | Occurred in the Kibaale District. |
| 2012 | SUDV | 7 | 4 | n/a | Occurred in the Luweero and Kampala districts of Uganda in November and December 2012 |
| Sept 2022–Jan 2023 | SUDV | 164 | 77 | 47% | Main article: 2022 Uganda Ebola outbreak On 20 September 2022 an outbreak was declared in Mubende District, Uganda. Seventy-seven people died, with a total of 164 cases detected. The outbreak was declared over in January 2023. |

== Epidemiology ==
As of 7 March 2025, a total of 14 cases (confirmed and probable) had been identified.

=== Timeline ===
On 19 January, the index case of the outbreak, a 32-year-old male nurse who was a resident of Wakiso District developed symptoms of Ebola and died on 29 January in Kampala District. While symptomatic, he reportedly sought care from a traditional healer in Mbale District and visited three different health facilities (One in Wakiso District, one in Mbale District and one in Kampala District).

On 2 February, a second case who was the wife of the index case was confirmed in Wakiso District.

By 9 February, nine cases had been confirmed with 1 death in 2 clusters; a family cluster and a healthcare facility cluster. Mbale District, Jinja District and Mukono District all had their first confirmed cases between 3 February and 9 February.

On 24 February, a four-year old boy died becoming the tenth confirmed case, he had sought treatment at three hospitals. His father said three of his siblings had been ill but recovered, and his mother and another sibling who was a newborn had died of unknown causes in February. The deaths have been classified as probable cases.

On 26 April 2025, the Ugandan ministry of health declared the end of the outbreak after no new cases were detected in the preceding 42 days.

| Districts | Cases | Deaths | Last update |
|---|---|---|---|
| Kampala District | 3 + 2 probable | 2 + 2 probable | 2 March 2025 |
| Wakiso District | 4 | | 2 March 2025 |
| Mbale District | 1 | | 2 March 2025 |
| Jinja District | 1 | | 2 March 2025 |
| Mukono District | 1 | | 2 March 2025 |
| Unknown | 2 | | 7 March 2025 |
| Total | (10 confirmed + 2 probable) 14 Total | (2 confirmed + 2 probable) 4 Total | 2 March 2025 |

== Response ==
The Ugandan Ministry of Health notified the World Health Organization (WHO) of an outbreak of Sudan Virus Disease (SVD) on 30 January after the confirmation of the index case by testing. By 2 February 234 contacts had been identified. The Ugandan Ministry of Health activated the national Incident Management Team (IMT) to coordinate the outbreak response. WHO allocated US$1 million from its Contingency Fund for Emergencies to help the country accelerate its early response actions. Three isolation facilities were established in Kampala District, Wakiso District and Mbale District. The Ugandan Ministry of Health with support from WHO launched a ring vaccination approach among primary and secondary contacts as part of a trial. On 6 February the US Centers for Disease Control and Prevention (CDC) issued an advisory on the outbreak.

Ugandan Minister of Health Jane Aceng warned locals on 7 February against exhuming bodies to perform religious or cultural rituals after some family of the index case attempted to exhume his body in Mbale for Islamic burial. Health and city authorities prevented the exhumation. The Kenyan Ministry of Health reported on 12 February its heightened alert level of preparedness including the preparation of rapid response teams, enhanced screening measures at high-risk border entry points and dedicated arrival zones for Ugandan travellers.

The outbreak was declared contained by Ugandan authorities on 18 February after the last among eight confirmed patients was discharged from hospital. However the confirmed case of the death of a 4 year old boy on 24 February returned the country to a more active response.

== Transmission and virology ==
Ebola is mainly spread through contact with bodily fluids. The average case fatality rate of Ebola (all 4 viruses) is 50%.
