= Taï Forest ebolavirus =

Tai Forest ebolavirus

Virus classification
- (unranked): Virus
- Realm: Riboviria
- Kingdom: Orthornavirae
- Phylum: Negarnaviricota
- Class: Monjiviricetes
- Order: Mononegavirales
- Family: Filoviridae
- Genus: Orthoebolavirus
- Species: Tai Forest ebolavirus

Synonyms
- Taï Forest virus (TAFV)

Species of virus

The species Taï Forest ebolavirus (/tɑːˈiː/) is a virological taxon included in the genus Orthoebolavirus, family Filoviridae, order Mononegavirales. The species has a single virus member, Taï Forest virus (TAFV). The members of the species are called Taï Forest ebolaviruses.

Tai Forest ebolavirus has been seen in a single human infection due to contact with chimpanzees from the Tai Forest in Côte d'Ivoire.

== Nomenclature ==
The name Taï Forest ebolavirus is derived from Parc National de Taï (the name of a national park in Côte d'Ivoire, where Taï Forest virus was first discovered) and the taxonomic suffix ebolavirus (which denotes an ebolavirus species). According to the rules for taxon naming established by the International Committee on Taxonomy of Viruses (ICTV), the name Taï Forest ebolavirus is always to be capitalized, italicized, never abbreviated, and to be preceded by the word "species". The names of its members (Taï Forest ebolaviruses) are to be capitalized, are not italicized, and used without articles.

The species was introduced in 1998 as Cote d'Ivoire Ebola virus. In 2002, the name was changed to Cote d'Ivoire ebolavirus. The name was proposed to be changed to Taï Forest ebolavirus in 2010, and this proposal was immediately accepted by the ICTV.

A virus of the genus Ebolavirus is a member of the species Taï Forest ebolavirus if:

- it is endemic in Côte d'Ivoire
- it has a genome with three gene overlaps (VP35/VP40, GP/VP30, VP24/L)
- it has a genomic sequence different from Ebola virus by ≥30% but different from that of Taï Forest virus by <30%.

Taï Forest virus (/tɑːˈiː/; TAFV) is a close relative of the much more commonly known Ebola virus (EBOV). TAFV causes severe disease in primates, the Ebola hemorrhagic fever. TAFV is a Select Agent, World Health Organization Risk Group 4 Pathogen (requiring Biosafety Level 4-equivalent containment), National Institutes of Health/National Institute of Allergy and Infectious Diseases Category A Priority Pathogen, Centers for Disease Control and Prevention Category A Bioterrorism Agent, and listed as a Biological Agent for Export Control by the Australia Group.

== Use of term ==
Taï Forest virus (abbreviated TAFV) was first described in 1995 as a new "strain" of Ebola virus. It is the single member of the species Taï Forest ebolavirus, which is included into the genus Ebolavirus, family Filoviridae, order Mononegavirales. The name Taï Forest virus is derived from Parc National de Taï (the name of a national park in Côte d'Ivoire, where it was first discovered) and the taxonomic suffix virus. According to the rules for taxon naming established by the International Committee on Taxonomy of Viruses (ICTV), the name Taï Forest virus is always to be capitalized, but (in contrast to taxon names, e. g. genus and species names) is never italicized, and may be abbreviated (with TAFV being the official abbreviation).

== Previous designations ==
Taï Forest virus was first introduced as a new "strain" of Ebola virus in 1995. In 2000, it received the designation Côte d'Ivoire Ebola virus, and in 2002 the name was changed to Côte d'Ivoire ebolavirus. (both times misspelling "Côte"). Other names circulating in the literature were the correct Côte d'Ivoire Ebola virus and Côte d'Ivoire ebolavirus, and the jargon terms Ivory Coast Ebola virus and Ivory Coast ebolavirus. Previous abbreviations for the virus were EBOV-CI (for Ebola virus Côte d'Ivoire or Ebola virus Côte d'Ivoire), EBOV-IC (for Ebola virus Ivory Coast), ICEBOV (for Ivory Coast Ebola virus or Ivory Coast ebolavirus) and most recently CIEBOV (for Cote d’Ivoire Ebola virus, Côte d'Ivoire Ebola virus, Côte d'Ivoire ebolavirus or Côte d'Ivoire ebolavirus). The virus received its final designation in 2010, when it was renamed Taï Forest virus (TAFV).

== Virus inclusion criteria ==
A virus of the species Taï Forest ebolavirus is a Taï Forest virus (TAFV) if it has the properties of Taï Forest ebolaviruses and if its genome diverges from that of the prototype Taï Forest virus, Taï Forest virus variant Côte d'Ivoire (TAFV/CI), by ≤10% at the nucleotide level.

== Disease ==
TAFV is one of four ebolaviruses that causes Ebola virus disease (EVD) in humans (in the literature also often referred to as Ebola hemorrhagic fever, EHF). EVD due to TAFV infection cannot be differentiated from EVD caused by other ebolaviruses by clinical observation alone, which is why the clinical presentation and pathology of infections by all ebolaviruses is presented together on a separate page (see Ebola virus disease). TAFV made its first and thus far only known appearance in 1994 during a viral hemorrhagic fever epizootic among western chimpanzees (Pan troglodytes verus) in Taï National Park, Côte d'Ivoire. As more dead western chimpanzees were discovered, many tested positive for infection with an ebolavirus distinct from those already known. One of the scientists performing the necropsies on the infected western chimpanzees contracted TAFV. She developed symptoms similar to those of dengue fever approximately a week after the necropsy, and was transported to Switzerland for treatment. She was discharged from hospital after two weeks and had fully recovered six weeks after the infection.

Ebola virus disease (EVD) outbreaks due to Taï Forest virus (TAFV) infection
Year	Geographic location	Human cases/deaths (case-fatality rate)
1994	Taï National Park, Côte d'Ivoire	1/0 (0%)

== Ecology ==
The ecology of TAFV is currently unclear and no reservoir host has yet been identified. Therefore, it remains unclear how TAFV was introduced into the western chimpanzee population. Bats are suspected to harbor the virus because infectious Marburg virus (MARV), a distantly related filovirus, has been isolated from bats, and because traces (but no infectious particles) of the more closely related Ebola virus (EBOV) were found in bats as well.

== Molecular biology ==
TAFV is basically uncharacterized on a molecular level. However, its genomic sequence, and with it the genomic organization and the conservation of individual open reading frames, is similar to that of the other four known ebolaviruses. It is therefore currently assumed that the knowledge obtained for EBOV can be extrapolated to TAFV and that all TAFV proteins behave analogous to those of EBOV.
