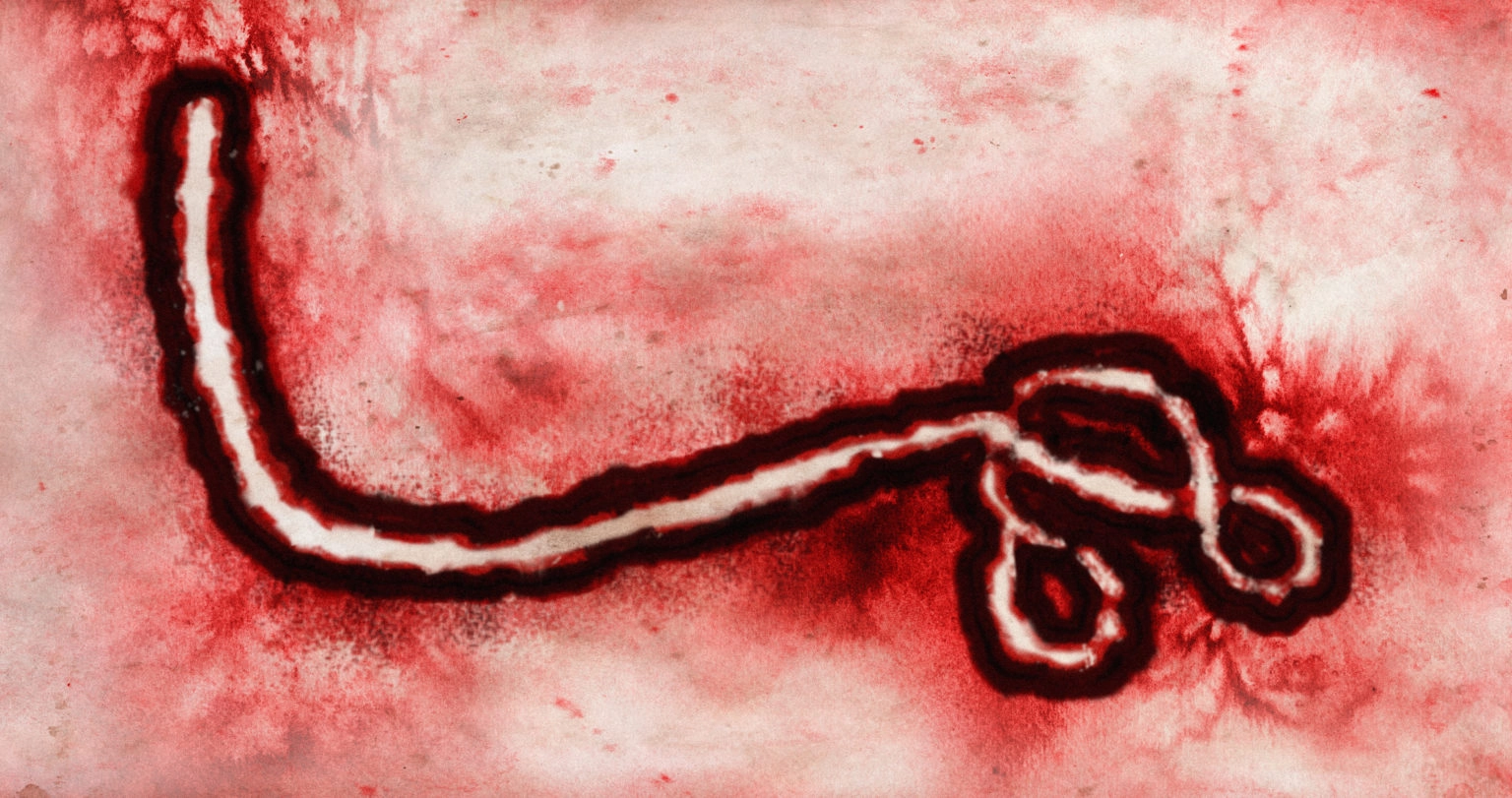

Virus classification
- (unranked): Virus
- Realm: Riboviria
- Kingdom: Orthornavirae
- Phylum: Negarnaviricota
- Class: Monjiviricetes
- Order: Mononegavirales
- Family: Filoviridae
- Genus: Orthoebolavirus
- Species: Orthoebolavirus bundibugyoense

= Bundibugyo ebolavirus =

Bundibugyo virus

Species of virus

Bundibugyo virus (BDBV) is a species of orthoebolavirus that is closely related to the Zaire ebolavirus (EBOV). The virus is one of several that can cause Ebola disease in humans, taking the form of viral hemorrhagic fever.

In the United States it was categorized as a select agent. It is also categorized as a World Health Organization Risk Group 4 Pathogen (requiring Biosafety Level 4-equivalent containment), NIH/NIAID Category A Priority Pathogen, and a Centers for Disease Control and Prevention Category A Bioterrorism Agent, and is listed as a Biological Agent for Export Control by the Australia Group.

The virus has caused Ebola outbreaks in 2007, 2012, and in 2026, with the 2026 Ebola epidemic being the fastest-growing Ebola outbreak on record.

Its name is derived from Bundibugyo in western Uganda where the virus was first discovered.

== Use of term ==
The species Orthoebolavirus bundibugyoense belongs to the genus Orthoebolavirus in the family Filoviridae. The species has a single virus member, Bundibugyo virus (BDBV). The members of the species are called Bundibugyo ebolaviruses. The virus's name is derived from Bundibugyo, the name of the chief town of the Ugandan Bundibugyo District, where Bundibugyo virus was first discovered.

Bundibugyo virus (abbreviated BDBV) was first described in 2008 as a single member of a suggested new species Bundibugyo ebolavirus, which was suggested to be included into the genus Ebolavirus, family Filoviridae, order Mononegavirales. A formal proposal to accept this species into virus taxonomy was submitted in 2010 and was accepted by the ICTV in 2011. In 2023, the species was renamed Orthoebolavirus bundibugyoense and the genus Orthoebolavirus.

== Species inclusion criteria ==
A virus of the genus Orthoebolavirus is a member of the species Orthoebolavirus bundibugyoense if:

- it is endemic in Uganda
- it has a genome with three gene overlaps (VP35/VP40, GP/VP30, VP24/L)
- it has a genomic sequence different from Zaire ebolavirus by ≥30%, but different from that of Bundibugyo virus by <30%

A virus of the species Orthoebolavirus bundibugyoense is a Bundibugyo virus if it has the properties of Bundibugyo ebolaviruses and if its genome diverges from that of the prototype Bundibugyo ebolavirus, Bundibugyo virus variant #811250 (BDBV/#811250), by ≤10% at the nucleotide level.

== Previous designations ==
Bundibugyo virus was first introduced as Bundibugyo ebolavirus in 2008, albeit without differentiating this name from the suggested species Bundibugyo ebolavirus. Another name introduced at the same time was Uganda ebolavirus. Later publications also referred to the virus as a novel "strain" of Zaire ebolavirus or as Bundibugyo Ebola virus. The abbreviations BEBOV (for Bundibugyo ebolavirus) and UEBOV (for Uganda ebolavirus) were briefly used before BDBV was established as the abbreviation for Bundibugyo virus.

== Epidemiology ==
Bundibugyo disease
- Specialty: Infectious disease
- Symptoms: Dry phase: Fever, headache, muscular and joint pain, fatigue, sore throat, trouble swallowing Wet phase: Vomiting, stomach ache, diarrhea, rash
- Usual onset: 2 to 3 weeks after exposure
- Causes: Bundibugyo ebolavirus

BDBV is one of four ebolaviruses that causes Ebola virus disease (EVD) in humans (also referred to as Ebola hemorrhagic fever, EHF). Symptoms of EVD due to BDBV infection are similar to EVD caused by other ebolaviruses, which is why infections by all ebolaviruses are presented together as Ebola virus disease.

=== Symptoms ===
The most common symptoms are similar to EBOV disease due to Zaire ebolavirus; fever, diarrhea and vomiting, headache, difficulty breathing and swallowing, and muscle and joint pain. However bleeding, a common feature of EBOV infection, occurred in relatively few (approximately 10%) with BDBV in 2026. The lack of bleeding has made it difficult to diagnose BDBV from symptoms alone, and made it less likely that people will be isolated or taken to hospital, thus contributing to the spread of disease.

In some cases, internal and external bleeding may occur. This typically begins five to seven days after the first symptoms. All infected people show some decreased blood clotting. Bleeding from mucous membranes or sites of needle punctures has been reported in 40–50% of cases. There may be vomiting blood, coughing up of blood, or blood in stool. Bleeding into the skin may create petechiae, purpura, bruising, or haematomas (especially around needle injection sites).

Bleeding into the whites of the eyes may also occur. Heavy bleeding is uncommon; if it occurs, it is usually in the gastrointestinal tract. The rate of bleeding into the gastrointestinal tract was reported to be ~58% in the 2001 outbreak in Gabon and DRC.

=== Rate of reproduction ===
Laboratory studies indicate that BDBV disease has a slower rate of reproduction than the more common species, Zaire ebolavirus (EBOV), according to an article in peer-reviewed media.

Laboratory studies indicate that BDBV has a slower rate of reproduction than EBOV. This may explain its lower case fatality rate.

=== 2007–08 ===
in August 2007, when a viral hemorrhagic fever outbreak began in the Bundibugyo and Kikyo townships of Bundibugyo District in western Uganda. Blood samples from suspect cases were sent to the US Centers for Disease Control and Prevention, where the presence of an ebolavirus was confirmed on November 29, 2007. In-depth analysis revealed that the ebolavirus was a relative, but not identical, to the other four ebolaviruses known at the time. The outbreak was declared over on February 20, 2008.

=== 2012 ===
A second outbreak was reported by the WHO in August 2012. The Democratic Republic of Congo announced a final tally of 77 cases (36 confirmed, 17 probable and 24 suspect) with 36 deaths (46.7% mortality rate). The index case, a hunter, is believed to have become infected after handling an antelope carcass.

=== 2026 (ongoing) ===
On May 15, 2026, a third outbreak of Bundibugyo ebolavirus was reported in the Democratic Republic of the Congo (DRC); the WHO declared the epidemic was a public health emergency of international concern two days later. There have been 2,325 confirmed deaths in the DRC, and two deaths in Uganda as of the third week of August 2026.

Ebola virus disease (EV) outbreaks due to Bundibugyo virus (BDBV) infection
Year	Geographic location	Deaths / Human Cases (case-fatality rate)
2007–2008	Bundibugyo District, Uganda	37 / 149 (25%)
2012	Province Orientale, DRC	29 / 57 (51%)
2026	Ituri Province, DRC, Uganda, France, Kenya, Nigeria	5,719 / 11,711 (48.8%) (as of 19/11/2026; ongoing)

== Reservoir ==
No reservoir host has yet been identified. Bats are suspected to harbor the virus because infectious Marburg virus (MARV) and Ravn virus (RAVV), two distantly related filoviruses, have been isolated from bats, and because traces (but no infectious particles) of the more closely related Zaire ebolavirus (EBOV) were found in bats as well.

Phylogenetic tree comparing ebolaviruses and marburgviruses. Numbers indicate percent confidence of branches.

== Molecular biology ==
BDBV is basically uncharacterized on a molecular level. However, its genomic sequence, and with it the genomic organization and the conservation of individual open reading frames, is similar to that of the other four known ebolaviruses (58-61% nucleotide similarity).

== Patent ==
A United States patent with multinational collaborative recognition was applied for on 10/26/2009, and published 10/4/2012, for the rights to BDBV. The patent is listed under six different numbers, including one assigned a US appellation, as well as one Canadian (CA), two European Patent Office (EP), and two World Intellectual Property Organization (WO) designations.

- US 20120251502 A1
- CA 2741523 A1
- EP 2350270 A2
- EP 2350270 A4
- WO 2010048615 A2
- WO 2010048615 A3

It is openly noted in the Deposit Statement of the patent application (Section [0002]) that the virus sample was deposited to the CDC in Atlanta, GA, on November 26, 2007, not to an International Depository Authority (IDA), which was the accepted method as established under the Budapest Treaty on the International Recognition of the Deposit of Microorganisms for Purposes of Patent Procedure. According to the same section, the "deposited organism" was also admittedly, "not acceptable by American Type Culture Collection." This sample was painstakingly researched and led to the patent application.

Section [0037] of the patent explains its purpose as having “utility in design of diagnostic assays to monitor Ebola HF [Hemorrhagic Fever] disease in humans and animals, and develop effective antivirals and vaccines.”
