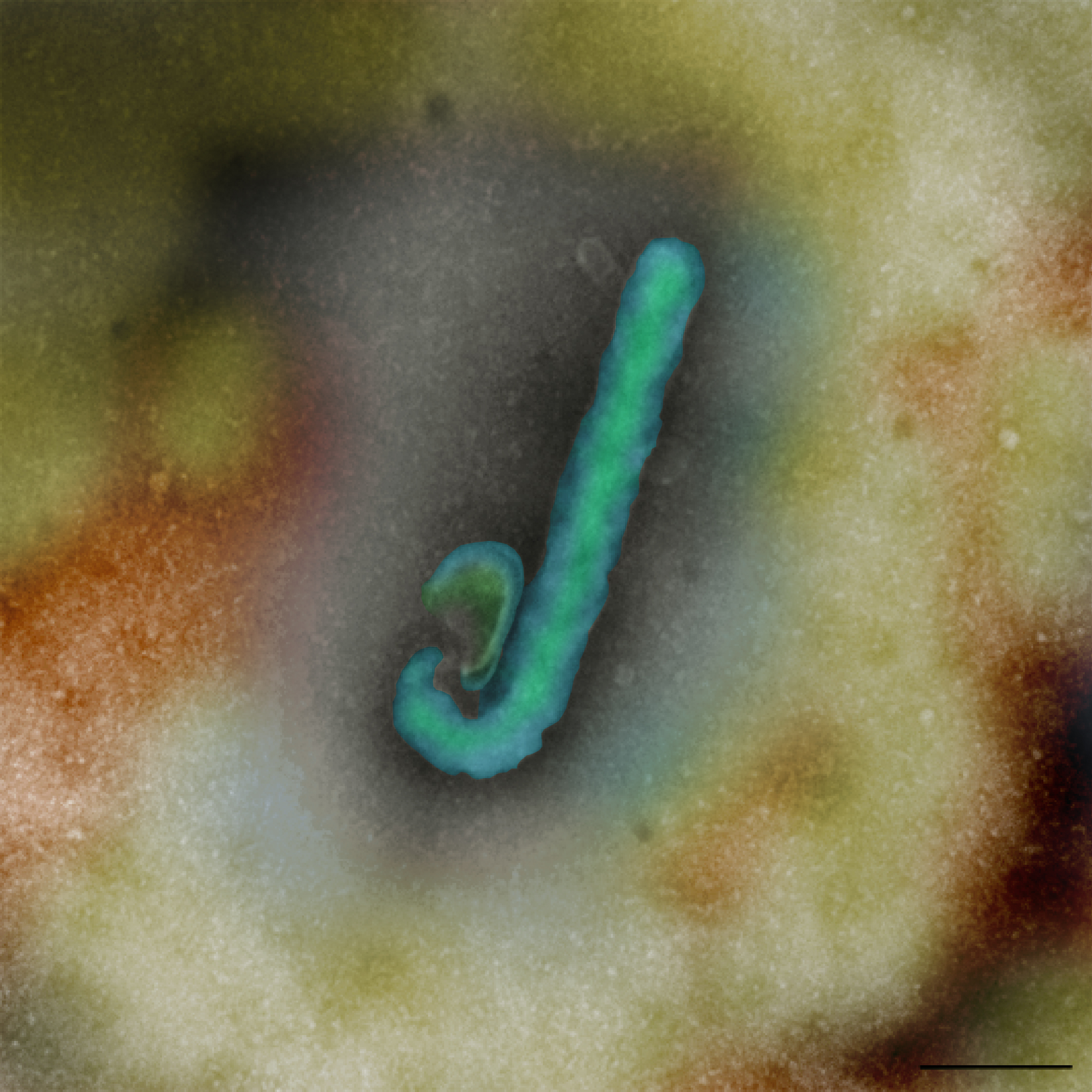
- An artificially colored transmission electron micrograph of the Reston virus

Virus classification
- (unranked): Virus
- Realm: Riboviria
- Kingdom: Orthornavirae
- Phylum: Negarnaviricota
- Class: Monjiviricetes
- Order: Mononegavirales
- Family: Filoviridae
- Genus: Orthoebolavirus
- Species: Reston ebolavirus

Synonyms
- Reston virus (RESTV)

= Reston virus =

Reston ebolavirus

Species of Ebola virus

Reston virus (RESTV) is one of six known viruses within the genus Orthoebolavirus. Reston virus causes Ebola virus disease in non-human primates; out of all 6 ebolaviruses, it is one of the only two known not to cause disease in humans, but has caused asymptomatic infections. Reston virus was first described in 1990 as a new "strain" of Ebola virus (EBOV). It is the single member of the species Reston ebolavirus, which is included into the genus Ebolavirus, family Filoviridae, order Mononegavirales. Reston virus is named after Reston, Virginia, US, where the virus was first discovered.

RESTV was discovered in crab-eating macaques imported by Hazleton Laboratories (now Fortrea) in 1989. This attracted significant media attention due to Reston's location in the Washington metropolitan area and the lethality of a closely related Ebola virus. Despite its status as a level-4 organism, Reston virus is non-pathogenic to humans, though hazardous to monkeys; the perception of its lethality was compounded by the monkey's coinfection with Simian hemorrhagic fever virus (SHFV). Despite ongoing research, the determinants for lack of human pathogenicity are yet to be discovered.

== Nomenclature ==
Reston virus was first introduced as a new "strain" of Ebola virus in 1990. In 2000, it received the designation Reston Ebola virus and in 2002, the name was changed to Reston ebolavirus. Previous abbreviations for the virus were EBOV-R (for Ebola virus Reston) and most recently REBOV (for Reston Ebola virus or Reston ebolavirus). The virus received its current designation in 2010, when it was renamed Reston virus (RESTV).

A virus of the species Reston ebolavirus is a Reston virus (RESTV) if it has the properties of Reston ebolaviruses and if its genome diverges from that of the prototype Reston virus. For example, there exists Reston virus variant Pennsylvania (RESTV/Pen), differing by less than 10% at the nucleotide level.

== History ==
=== Discovery ===
While investigating an outbreak of Simian hemorrhagic fever (SHFV) in November 1989, an electron microscopist from USAMRIID named Thomas W. Geisbert discovered filoviruses similar in appearance to Ebola virus in tissue samples taken from a crab-eating macaque imported from the Philippines to a facility operated by Hazleton Laboratories (now Fortrea) in Reston, Virginia. The filovirus was further isolated by Dr. Peter Jahrling, and over the period of three months over a third of the monkeys died—at a rate of two or three a day.

Blood samples were taken from 178 animal handlers during the incident. Of them, six eventually seroconverted, testing positive using ELISA. They remained, however, asymptomatic. In January 1990, an animal handler at Hazleton cut himself while performing a necropsy on the liver of an infected Cynomolgus. Under the direction of the Centers for Disease Control and Prevention (CDC), the animal handler was placed under surveillance for the duration of the incubation period. When the animal handler failed to become ill, it was concluded that the virus had a low pathogenicity in humans.

=== Investigation ===
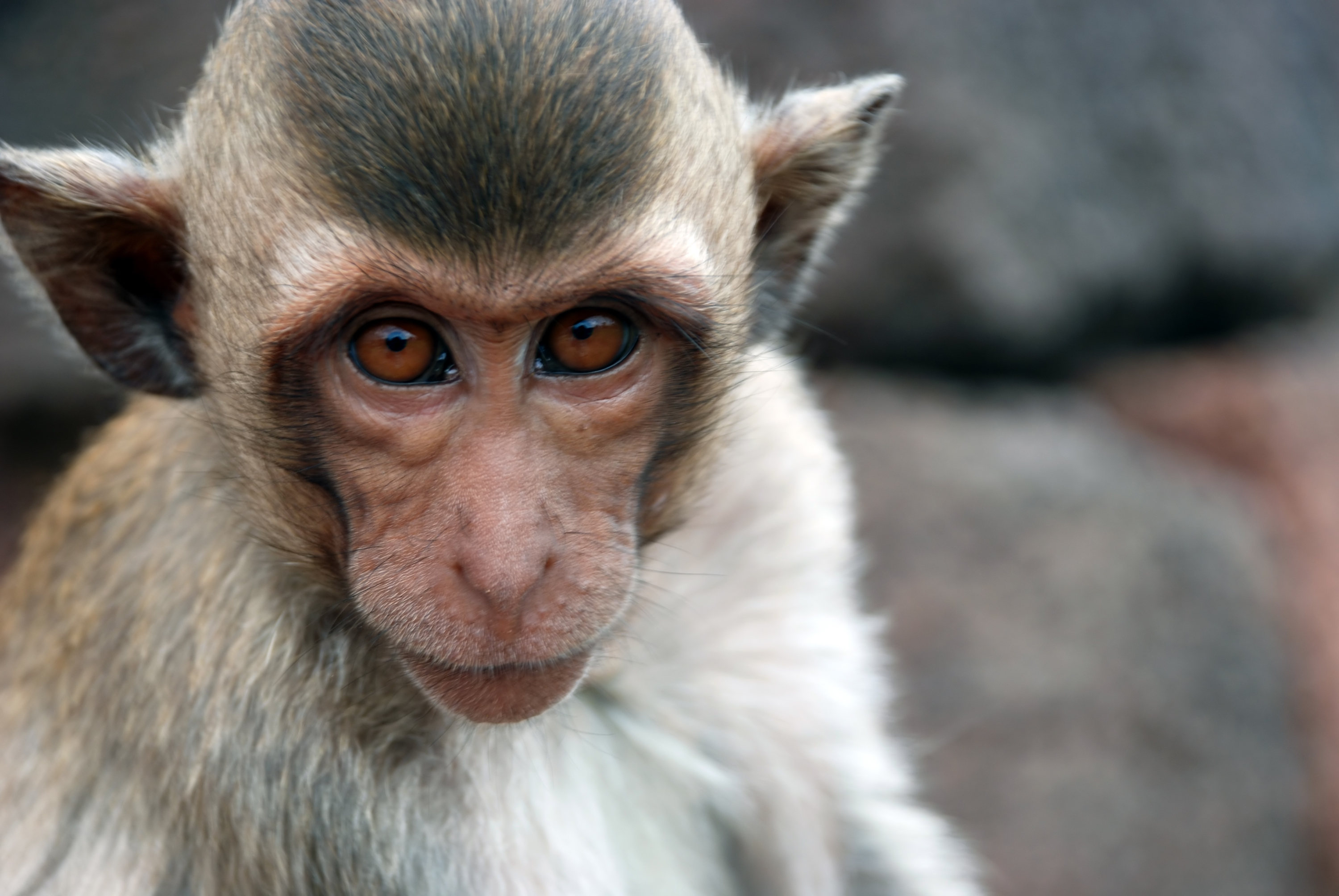
Crab-eating macaques, imported from the Philippines, were found to be carrying the filovirus.

Following the discovery of a filovirus in crab-eating macaques, an investigation tracing the infection was conducted by the CDC. The monkeys were imported from the Philippines, which had no previous record of SHFV or ebolavirus infections. It was suspected that the monkeys contracted both diseases while in transit aboard KLM Airlines before reaching Reston. Shipments were tracked to New York City, Texas, and Mexico City, none of which produced cases of infection.

By January 1990, Hazleton Laboratories recovered from its previous losses and began importing monkeys again from the same establishment in Manila that had provided the original animals. The imported monkeys became infected and were euthanized. In early February the CDC received reports of the disease in Alice, Texas. In March, the Division of Quarantine at the CDC secured a temporary ban on the importation of monkeys into the United States from anywhere in the world.

Following the announcement of the filovirus disease outbreak in Reston, Virginia, a serosurvey was conducted to assess the prevalence of the infection. Of the several hundred serums received by the CDC, approximately ten percent showed some reaction to ebolavirus antigen—though usually at low levels. Counterintuitively, the majority of the monkeys found positive were from Indonesia.

In May 1990, an investigation led by Susan Fisher-Hoch, Steve Ostroff, and Jerry Jennings was sent to Indonesia. During the investigation, it was hypothesized that there could be a cross infection since monkeys suspected of illness were typically placed in gang cages containing up to twenty to thirty other monkeys suspected of illness. Upon arrival they were told that most of the monkeys were imported from the island of Sumatra. The investigation team found no trace of the virus in either case.

Following the investigation in Indonesia, an experiment was conducted in the level-4 lab at the CDC campus in DeKalb County, Georgia with thirty-two monkeys: sixteen green monkeys (Cercopithecus aethiops) and sixteen crab-eating macaques. Half of the sixteen green monkeys and crab-eating macaques were infected with Reston virus and the other half with Ebola virus. Ebola virus infection was lethal to nearly all monkeys. However, most of the monkeys infected with Reston virus recovered in a month. The surviving monkeys were kept for two years to detect any trace of the virus - none was found. However, the monkeys continued to possess a high level of antibody.

=== Post-Reston ===
Following the test at the CDC campus in DeKalb County, two of the monkeys who had survived Reston virus infection were infected with a very large dose of the Ebola virus in an effort to produce an Ebola vaccine. One of the two monkeys remained resistant; the second died.

The physical building in which the outbreak occurred was demolished on 30 May 1995 and a daycare center was constructed in its place. Modern spatial computer simulation indicates that the pathogen could have reached both major airports (Dulles International Airport and Ronald Reagan Washington National Airport) in less than 45 minutes assuming direct transmission paths.

=== Outbreaks and cases ===
- 1989 –1990 Philippines – High mortality among crab-eating macaques in a primate facility responsible for exporting animals in the United States. Three workers in the facility developed antibodies but did not get sick.
- 1989 Reston, Virginia, United States – RESTV was introduced into quarantine facilities in Virginia and Pennsylvania by monkeys imported from the Philippines.
- 1989–1990 – RESTV was introduced into quarantine facilities in Texas by monkeys imported from the Philippines. Four humans developed antibodies but did not get sick.
- 1996 Alice, Texas, United States – An outbreak occurred at the Texas Primate Center that imported monkeys from the Philippines.
- 2008 Manila, Philippines – On 11 December 2008, pigs from farms slightly north of Manila, Philippines tested positive for the virus. The CDC and the World Health Organization are investigating. On 23 January 2009, Philippine health officials announced that a hog farm worker had been infected with the virus. Although the man was asymptomatic and the source of the infection is uncertain, this could represent the first case of pig-to-human transmission of Reston virus – a fact that could cause concern, as pigs may be able to transmit more deadly diseases to humans. The situation was investigated. Eventually six workers were found to test sero-positive for antibodies to Reston ebolavirus. None developed any noticeable symptoms of illness.
- 2015 Manila, Philippines – On 6 September the department of health reported an outbreak of the Reston Ebola virus in a research breeding facility under primates. Twenty-five workers were tested for the virus. All of the workers tested negative for the disease.

== In popular culture ==
- Richard Preston's 1994 best-selling book, The Hot Zone, dramatized the Ebola virus outbreak in Reston, Virginia. In 2019 National Geographic aired a six-episode miniseries, also titled The Hot Zone.

== Bibliography ==
- McCormick, Joseph; Fisher-Hoch, Susan (June 1999) [1996]. Level 4: Virus Hunters of the CDC. Horvitz, Leslie Alan ("Updated edition" 3rd ed.). Barnes & Noble. ISBN 978-0-7607-1208-5.
- Preston, Richard (1997). The Hot Zone. Anchor Books (June 15, 1999). ISBN 978-0385495226
