= Sudan ebolavirus =

Virus classification
- (unranked): Virus
- Realm: Riboviria
- Kingdom: Orthornavirae
- Phylum: Negarnaviricota
- Class: Monjiviricetes
- Order: Mononegavirales
- Family: Filoviridae
- Genus: Orthoebolavirus
- Species: Sudan ebolavirus

Member virus
- Sudan virus (SUDV)

Species of virus

The species Sudan ebolavirus is a virological taxon included in the genus Orthoebolavirus, family Filoviridae, order Mononegavirales. The species has a single virus member, Sudan virus (SUDV), which causes Sudan virus disease. The members of the species are called Sudan ebolaviruses. It was discovered in 1977 and causes Ebola clinically indistinguishable from the ebola Zaire strain, but is less transmissible than it. Unlike with ebola Zaire there is no vaccine available.

== Nomenclature ==
The name Sudan ebolavirus is derived from Sudan (the country in which Sudan virus was first discovered) and the taxonomic suffix ebolavirus (which denotes an ebolavirus species).

The species was introduced in 1998 as Sudan Ebola virus. In 2002, the name was changed to Sudan ebolavirus.

A virus of the genus Ebolavirus is a member of the species Sudan ebolavirus if:

- it is endemic in Sudan and/or Uganda
- it has a genome with three gene overlaps (VP35/VP40, GP/VP30, VP24/L)
- it has a genomic sequence different from Ebola virus by ≥30% but different from that of Sudan virus by <30%

Sudan virus (SUDV) is one of six known viruses within the genus Ebolavirus and one of four that are capable of causing Ebola virus disease (EVD) in humans and other primates; it is the sole member of the species Sudan ebolavirus. SUDV is a Select agent, World Health Organization Risk Group 4 Pathogen (requiring Biosafety Level 4-equivalent containment), National Institutes of Health/National Institute of Allergy and Infectious Diseases Category A Priority Pathogen, Centers for Disease Control and Prevention Category A Bioterrorism Agent, and listed as a Biological Agent for Export Control by the Australia Group.

The first known outbreak of EVD caused by Sudan ebolavirus occurred in modern-day South Sudan between June and November 1976, infecting 284 people and killing 151, with the first identifiable case on 27 June 1976.

== Use of term ==
Sudan virus (abbreviated SUDV) was first described in 1977. It is the single member of the species Sudan ebolavirus, which is included into the genus Ebolavirus, family Filoviridae, order Mononegavirales. The name Sudan virus is derived from South Sudan (where it was first discovered before South Sudan seceded from Sudan) and the taxonomic suffix virus.

== Previous designations ==
Sudan virus was first introduced as a new "strain" of Ebola virus in 1977. Sudan virus was described as "Ebola haemorrhagic fever" in a 1978 WHO report describing the 1976 Sudan outbreak. In 2000, it received the designation Sudan Ebola virus and in 2002 the name was changed to Sudan ebolavirus. Previous abbreviations for the virus were EBOV-S (for Ebola virus Sudan) and most recently SEBOV (for Sudan Ebola virus or Sudan ebolavirus). The virus received its final designation in 2010, when it was renamed Sudan virus (SUDV).

== Virus inclusion criteria ==
A virus of the species Sudan ebolavirus is a Sudan virus (SUDV) if it has the properties of Sudan ebolaviruses and if its genome diverges from that of the prototype Sudan virus, Sudan virus variant Boniface (SUDV/Bon), by ≤10% at the nucleotide level.

== Disease ==
SUDV is one of four ebolaviruses that causes Ebola virus disease (EVD) in humans (in the literature also often referred to as Ebola hemorrhagic fever, EHF). EVD due to SUDV infection cannot be differentiated from EVD caused by other ebolaviruses by clinical observation alone, which is why the clinical presentation and pathology of infections by all ebolaviruses is presented together on a separate page. The strain is less transmissible than Zaire ebolavirus.

In the past, SUDV has caused the following EVD outbreaks:

Ebola virus disease (EVD) outbreaks due to Sudan virus (SUDV) infection
Year	Geographic location	Human cases/deaths (case-fatality rate)
1976	Juba, Maridi, Nzara, and Tembura, South Sudan	284/151 (53%)
1979	Nzara, South Sudan	34/22 (65%)
2000–2001	Gulu, Mbarara, and Masindi Districts, Uganda	425/224 (53%)
2004	Yambio County, South Sudan	17/7 (41%)
2011	Luweero District, Uganda	1/1 (100%)
2014	Equateur, Congo	1/0 * two strains reported, one Sudan and one Sudan/Zaire Hybrid to 24/08/2014 (0%)
2022-2023	Central and Western Regions, Uganda	164/77 (47%)

== Vaccine development ==
As of 2022, there are six experimental vaccines but only three have advanced to the stage where human clinical trials have begun.

As the Public Health Agency of Canada developed a candidate RVSV vaccine for Sudan ebolavirus. Merck was developing it, but as of 18 October 2022 had discontinued development; Merck's monopolies on rVSV techniques, acquired with funding from GAVI, are not available to others developing rVSV vaccines.

As of 2021 GeoVax was developing MVA-SUDV-VLP, which is a modified vaccinia Ankara virus producing Sudan virus-like particles; early data from their research showed the GeoVax vaccine candidate to be 100% effective at preventing death from the Sudan ebolavirus in animals.

An adenovirus based vaccine previously licensed by GSK was donated to and further developed by the Sabin Vaccine Institute in partnership with the Vaccine Research Center at the US National Institute of Allergy and Infectious Diseases; as of October 2022, it will be offered to contacts of known SDV cases in the 2022 Uganda Ebola outbreak as part of a clinical trial.

== Ecology ==
The ecology of SUDV is currently unclear and no reservoir host has yet been identified. Therefore, it remains unclear how SUDV was repeatedly introduced into human populations. As of 2009, bats have been suspected to harbor the virus because infectious Marburg virus (MARV), a distantly related filovirus, has been isolated from bats, and because traces (but no infectious particles) of the more closely related Ebola virus (EBOV) were found in bats as well.

== Molecular biology ==
SUDV is basically uncharacterized on a molecular level. However, its genomic sequence, and with it the genomic organization and the conservation of individual open reading frames, is similar to that of the other four known ebolaviruses. It is therefore currently assumed that the knowledge obtained for EBOV can be extrapolated to SUDV and that all SUDV proteins behave analogous to those of EBOV.
