= Ishizaka =

Ishizaka (written: 石坂 lit. "stone hill") is a Japanese surname. Notable people with the surname include:

- Danjulo Ishizaka, German-Japanese cellist, brother of Kimiko Douglass-Ishizaka
- Keiichi Ishizaka (石坂 敬一; 1945–2016), Japanese music industry executive
- Kimishige Ishizaka (石坂 公成; born 1925), Japanese scientist
- Kōji Ishizaka (石坂 浩二; born 1941), Japanese actor
- Manami Ishizaka (石坂 真奈美; born 1986), Japanese artistic gymnast
- Masaru Ishizaka (石坂太; born 1980), Japanese politician
- Taizō Ishizaka (石坂 泰三; 1886–1975), Japanese businessman
- Teruko Ishizaka (石坂 照子), Japanese scientist
- Wataru Ishizaka (石坂 わたる; born 1976), Japanese politician
- Yōjirō Ishizaka (石坂 洋次郎; 1900–1986), Japanese writer
- Yukiko Ishizaka (石坂 有紀子; born 1968), Japanese beach volleyball player

== See also ==
- Kimiko Douglass-Ishizaka (born 1976), German-Japanese classical pianist, weightlifter and powerlifter
