= Passano Foundation =

American biomedical research foundation

The Passano Foundation is an American foundation that recognizes researchers for contributions to medical science. Founded in 1943 by medical publisher Edward Boetler Passano, it has presented the annual Passano Award since 1945. The award recognizes research carried out in the United States, with a focus on work having immediate clinical value or the prospect of practical application in the near future.

The foundation also presents annual awards to early-career physician-scientists at the Johns Hopkins School of Medicine and the University of Maryland School of Medicine. More than 20 Passano laureates have subsequently received Nobel Prizes.

== History ==
Edward Boetler Passano, a former chair of medical publisher Williams & Wilkins, founded the Passano Foundation in 1943 to support medical science and research, particularly work with potential clinical applications. The first recipient of the Passano Award was Edwin J. Cohn of Harvard University, who was selected in 1945 for research on blood plasma and its clinical applications. The award was then valued at $5,000.

== Passano Award laureates ==
- 2025 Craig M. Crews, Raymond J. Deshaies
- 2024 K. Christopher Garcia
- 2023 Se-Jin Lee
- 2022 Duojia Pan
- 2021 Alfred Goldberg
- 2020 David Eisenberg
- 2019 Robert Fettiplace, James Hudspeth
- 2018 Carl June, Michel Sadelain
- 2017 Yuan Chang, Patrick S. Moore
- 2016 Jonathan C. Cohen, Helen Hobbs
- 2015 James P. Allison (2018 Nobel Prize in Physiology or Medicine)
- 2014 Jeffrey I. Gordon
- 2013 Rudolf Jaenisch
- 2012 Eric N. Olson
- 2011 Elaine Fuchs
- 2010 David Julius (2021 Nobel Prize in Physiology or Medicine)
- 2009 Irving Weissman
- 2008 Thomas Südhof (2013 Nobel Prize in Physiology or Medicine)
- 2007 Joan Massagué Solé
- 2006 Napoleone Ferrara
- 2005 Jeffrey M. Friedman
- 2003 Andrew Z. Fire (2006 Nobel Prize in Physiology or Medicine)
- 2002 Alexander Rich
- 2001 Seymour Benzer
- 2000 Giuseppe Attardi, Douglas C. Wallace
- 1999 Elizabeth Blackburn (2009 Nobel Prize in Physiology or Medicine), Carol W. Greider (2009 Nobel Prize in Physiology or Medicine)
- 1998 H. Robert Horvitz (2002 Nobel Prize in Physiology or Medicine)
- 1997 James E. Darnell, Jr.
- 1996 Leland H. Hartwell (2001 Nobel Prize in Physiology or Medicine)
- 1995 Robert G. Roeder, Robert Tjian
- 1994 Bert Vogelstein
- 1993 Jack L. Strominger, Don Craig Wiley
- 1992 Charles Yanofsky
- 1991 William S. Sly, Stuart Kornfeld
- 1990 Alfred Goodman Gilman (1994 Nobel Prize in Physiology or Medicine)
- 1989 Victor Almon McKusick
- 1988 Edwin Gerhard Krebs (1992 Nobel Prize in Physiology or Medicine), Edmond Henri Fischer (1992 Nobel Prize in Physiology or Medicine)
- 1987 Irwin Fridovich
- 1986 Albert L. Lehninger, Eugene P. Kennedy
- 1985 Howard Green
- 1984 Peter Nowell
- 1983 John Michael Bishop (1989 Nobel Prize in Physiology or Medicine), Harold Elliot Varmus (1989 Nobel Prize in Physiology or Medicine)
- 1982 Roscoe O. Brady, Elizabeth F. Neufeld
- 1981 Hugh McDevitt
- 1980 Seymour S. Kety
- 1979 Donald F. Steiner
- 1978 Michael Stuart Brown (1985 Nobel Prize in Physiology or Medicine), Joseph L. Goldstein (1985 Nobel Prize in Physiology or Medicine)
- 1977 Curt P. Richter
- 1976 Roger Charles Louis Guillemin (1977 Nobel Prize in Physiology or Medicine)
- 1975 Henry G. Kunkel
- 1974 Seymour S. Cohen, Baruch Samuel Blumberg (1976 Nobel Prize in Physiology or Medicine)
- 1973 Roger Sperry (1981 Nobel Prize in Physiology or Medicine)
- 1972 Kimishige Ishizaka, Teruko Ishizaka
- 1971 Stephen W. Kuffler
- 1970 Paul Zamecnik
- 1969 George Herbert Hitchings (1988 Nobel Prize in Physiology or Medicine)
- 1968 John E. Howard
- 1967 Irvine Page
- 1966 John T. Edsall
- 1965 Charles Brenton Huggins (1966 Nobel Prize in Physiology or Medicine)
- 1964 Keith R. Porter, George Emil Palade (1974 Nobel Prize in Physiology or Medicine)
- 1963 Horace Winchell Magoun
- 1962 Albert Hewett Coons
- 1961 Owen Harding Wangensteen
- 1960 René Dubos
- 1959 Stanhope Bayne-Jones
- 1958 George W. Corner
- 1957 William M. Clark
- 1956 George Nicolas Papanicolaou
- 1955 Vincent du Vigneaud (1955 Nobel Prize in Chemistry)
- 1954 Homer Smith
- 1953 John Franklin Enders (1954 Nobel Prize in Physiology or Medicine)
- 1952 Herbert M. Evans
- 1951 Philip Levine, Alexander Solomon Wiener
- 1950 Edward Calvin Kendall (1950 Nobel Prize in Physiology or Medicine), Philip Showalter Hench (1950 Nobel Prize in Physiology or Medicine)
- 1949 Oswald Avery
- 1948 Alfred Blalock, Helen Brooke Taussig
- 1947 Selman Abraham Waksman (1952 Nobel Prize in Physiology or Medicine)
- 1946 Ernest W. Goodpasture
- 1945 Edwin J. Cohn

=== Young Scientist Award ===
- 1992 Tom Curran
- 1991 Roger Tsien (2008 Nobel Prize in Chemistry)
- 1990 Matthew P. Scott
- 1989 Louis M. Kunkel
- 1988 Peter Walter
- 1987 Jeremy Nathans
- 1986 James Rothman (2013 Nobel Prize in Physiology or Medicine)
- 1985 Mark M. Davis
- 1984 Thomas R. Cech (1989 Nobel Prize in Chemistry)
- 1983 Gerald M. Rubin, Allan C. Spradling
- 1982 Roger D. Kornberg (2006 Nobel Prize in Chemistry)
- 1981 William A. Catterall, Joel M. Moss
- 1979 Richard Axel (2004 Nobel Prize in Physiology or Medicine)
- 1978 Robert Lefkowitz (2012 Nobel Prize in Chemistry)
- 1977 Eric A. Jaffe
- 1976 Ralph A. Bradshaw
- 1975 Joan A. Steitz
