= Erica Ollmann Saphire =

American structural biologist, immunologist and researcher

Erica Ollmann Saphire is an American structural biologist and immunologist and a professor at the La Jolla Institute for Immunology. She investigates the structural biology of viruses and studies how human antibodies target viral proteins to neutralize infection. Her laboratory focuses on viruses that cause that cause hemorrhagic fever such as Ebola, Sudan, Marburg, Bundibugyo, and Lassa. Saphire also studies paramyxoviruses, such as Nipah virus and measles virus, as well as rabies virus, SARS-CoV-2, and endogenous retroviruses.

Saphire has served as president and CEO of La Jolla Institute for Immunology since 2021.

== Early life and education ==
Saphire grew up in Lago Vista, Texas. Saphire earned a Bachelor of Arts in biochemistry and cell biology from Rice University in 1993.

While attending Rice University, Saphire avoided taking a molecular biophysics course known for being extremely difficult since she did not want a bad grade that would affect her plans of graduate school. When she finally took the class, she discovered her passion for studying molecular structures such as antibodies and viruses that may cause harm to human health.

She then moved to Scripps Research, where she earned a PhD in molecular biology in 2000. For her doctoral research, Saphire solved the first crystal structure of a neutralizing human IgG against HIV. This antibody, called IgG1 b12, recognized the CD4-binding site of human immunodeficiency virus–1 (HIV-1) gp120 and provided a framework for future HIV vaccine strategies that aimed to elicit antibodies with the same neutralizing capability. She was an avid rugby player throughout college and graduate school, and toured twice with the United States women's national rugby union team.

== Career and research ==
After an immunology postdoctoral fellowship at Scripps Research, Saphire joined the faculty in the department of immunology as an assistant professor in 2003. She was promoted to associate professor in 2008 and full professor in 2012. In 2019, joined the faculty at the La Jolla Institute for Immunology.

Saphire is best known for her research on Lassa virus, Ebola virus and other causes of viral hemorrhagic fever.

Saphire was the first to solve the structure of the Lassa virus surface glycoprotein bound with an antibody from a human Lassa virus infection survivor. She went on to show that an experimental monoclonal antibody therapeutic "cocktail" could neutralize Lassa virus by targeting its glycoprotein complex.

Saphire was also the first to discover the structure of the Ebola virus surface glycoprotein and predicted that the Ebola virus receptor was located in the endosome rather than on the cell surface. Later, she showed that the Ebola virus VP40 matrix protein can fold into multiple distinct structures. In 2024, Saphire used in situ cryo-electron tomography to illuminate Ebola virus replication factories inside living cells revealing a hitherto unresolved third and outer layer of the nucleoprotein.

Her laboratory has also discovered the structure of the glycoproteins of Sudan virus, Marburg virus, Bundibugyo virus, Lassa virus and lymphocytic choriomeningitis virus LCMV. She also conducted field work in Sierra Leone to study the spread of Lassa virus.

In recent work, Saphire determined the cryo-electron microscopy structure of the measles virus fusion protein in complex with an antibody and determined that the antibody can trap the fusion protein in an intermediate state, thus halting fusion.

== 2013-2016 Ebola virus epidemic ==
Saphire served as director of the Viral Hemorrhagic Fever Immunotherapeutic Consortium (VIC) during the 2013-2016 Western African Ebola epidemic. In this role, Saphire established collaborations to rapidly develop treatments for Ebola virus. Saphire attracted national media attention in 2014 when she launched a crowdfunding appeal to raise funds for equipment to assist in research to fight Ebola virus. During this time, Saphire also led structural studies to understand how the monoclonal antibody therapeutic ZMapp neutralized Ebola virus.

== Leadership in science ==
In 2020, Saphire was named director of the Coronavirus Immunotherapy Consortium (CoVIC), an international effort to evaluate human antibodies against the novel coronavirus, SARS-CoV-2. Her lab also co-led research into COVID-19 mutations with scientists at the Los Alamos National Laboratory. Saphire also leads "America's SHIELD:Strategic Herpesvirus Immune Evasion and Latency Defense" as part of ARPA-H's Antigens Predicted for Broad Viral Efficacy through Computational Experimentation (APECx) program.

In 2021, Saphire was appointed president and CEO of La Jolla Institute for Immunology. She succeeded Dr. Mitchell Kronenberg, who had served as institute president since 2003. Saphire is the institute's fifth president and is the first woman to serve in that role. Under Saphire's leadership, LJI opened a Center for Sex-Based Differences in 2021.

== Awards ==
Saphire received the Presidential Early Career Award for Scientists and Engineers and the Global Virus Network's Gallo Award for Scientific Excellence and Leadership. She received the Investigator in the Pathogenesis for Infectious Disease Award from the Burroughs Wellcome Fund in 2009, the American Society for Biochemistry and Molecular Biology's Young Investigator Award in 2015, a Fulbright Global Scholar fellowship from the U.S. Department of State in 2018, the Pantheon Award for Academia, Non-Profit, & Research in 2023, the Marion Spencer Fay Award in 2023 and the Bert & Natalie Vallee Award in Biomedical Science in 2023.

Award	Organization	Date Received
Presidential Early Career Award for Scientists and Engineers	National Science Foundation	
Gallo Award for Scientific Excellence and Leadership	Global Virus Network	2020
Young Investigator Award	American Society for Biochemistry and Molecular Biology	2015
Pantheon Award for Academia, Non-Profit & Research	California Life Sciences	2023
Marion Spencer Fay Award	Lynn Yeakel Institute for Women's Health and Leadership at Drexel University College of Medicine	2023
Bert & Natalie Vallee Award in Biomedical Science	American Society for Biochemistry and Molecular Biology	2023
