= Attardi =

Attardi is a surname. Notable people with the name include:

- Alphonse Attardi (1892–1970), American mobster
- Giuseppe Attardi (1923 –2008), American molecular biologist of Italian origin and professor at the California Institute of Technology in Pasadena
- Laura Attardi, American Professor of the School of Medicine, and professor of radiation oncology and genetics at Stanford University
- Ugo Attardi (1923–2006), Italian painter, sculptor and writer
