= Ebola viral protein 24 =

Matrix protein

eVP24
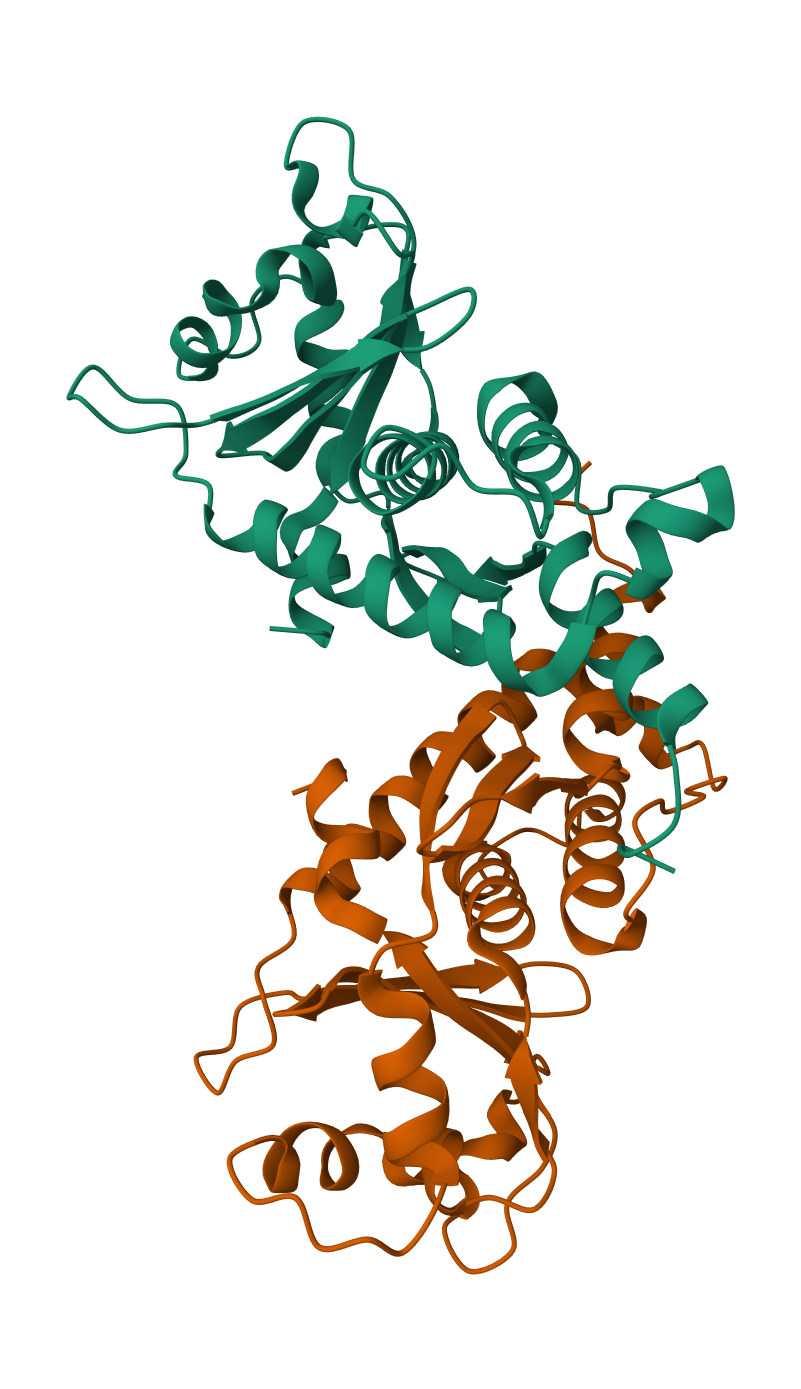
- Structure of eVP24 from Zaire ebolavirus. 4M0Q

Identifiers
- Symbol: eVP24
- Pfam: PF06389
- InterPro: IPR009433
Available protein structures:
- Pfam: structures / ECOD
- PDB: RCSB PDB; PDBe; PDBj
- PDBsum: structure summary

Ebola viral protein 24 (eVP24) is considered a multifunctional secondary matrix protein present in viral particles. The broad roles eVP24 performs involve the formation of fully functional and infectious viral particles, promotion of filamentous nucleocapsid formation, mediation of host responses to infection, and suppression of the host innate immune system. It has been noted that eVP24 function can overlap with that of two other viral proteins; eVP40 matrix protein which functions in virus budding, and eVP35 which is also associated with immune suppression.

== History ==
=== Research ===
The first recorded human outbreak of Ebola virus disease was in 1976 and since then, there has been considerable effort to define the progression of the disease and the virus responsible. The history of Ebola virus characterization is rather short as most research on the mechanisms employed by the virus have occurred in the last two decades. This is due to the intensive biohazard containment required for laboratory studies of the virus and the difficulty in obtaining samples for study, particularly in common outbreak regions. The isolation of viral cDNAs has allowed research into viral gene products to progress. The genome of the Ebola virus was found to encode seven proteins: glycoprotein; nucleoprotein; matrix proteins, VP40 and VP24; nonstructural proteins, VP30 and VP35; and viral polymerase. The functions of the viral proteins remained the last to be well investigated. In particular, eVP24 remained the least studied for some time.

=== Characterization ===
eVP24 was initially described as a matrix protein that had similar properties and functions of eVP40. eVP24 was found to have characteristics of typical viral matrix proteins, such as a strong association with lipid bilayers and the ability to oligomerize to form tetramers. Like eVP40, eVP24 was found to be essential in virion assembly and budding. Later research indicated that the expression of eVP24 was required to switch from viral transcription and replication to virion assembly. A new role for eVP24 was found when its expression was monitored in rodent species where changes in eVP24 seemed to be responsible for enhancing virulence, indicating that adaption of Ebola in animal models occurs through mutations in eVP24. Additionally, eVP24 inhibits interferon signaling by competitively binding to karyopherins which blocks phosphorylated STAT1 nuclear import. In 2014, it was found that this mechanism interferes with the cells response to viral infection, which suppressed the innate immune response, allowing the virus to proliferate in the body.

== Function ==
eVP24 disrupts the signaling pathway of STAT1. The STAT1 protein is phosphorylated by interferons in response to viral infection causing it to express a non-classical nuclear localization signal and bind to the importin protein karyopherin-α (KPNA). Once bound to KPNA, STAT1 is transported to the nucleus where it stimulates gene transcription in response to viral infection. Classical nuclear localization signals are bound by arms 2-4 or by 6-8 of KPNA while non-classical nuclear localization signals are bound by KPNA 1, 5 and 6 in arms 8-10 allowing non classical signals to be transported at the same time as classical signals, providing faster signaling of certain signals. The eVP24 protein operates by binding to KPNA preventing the binding of STAT1. As a result, STAT1 is not able to elicit an immune response, however nuclear import is able to proceed as normal which may be important for viral replication. This means that eVP24 prevents the activation of an immune response against the Ebola virus without sacrificing its ability to have viral components transported to the nucleus or the target cell. eVP24 provides Ebola with an advantages over other viruses which disrupt STAT1 because unlike most other viruses, eVP24 uses mimicry of the STAT1 protein. This makes it very unlikely for the host to develop an adaptation as mutations in KPNA which prevent eVP24 binding are also likely to prevent STAT1 signalling.

== Mechanism ==
eVP24 prevents the function of KPNA by binding in a region which overlaps with the binding region of STAT1. This is accomplished by the high binding affinity between KNPA and eVP24. These proteins have very high complementarity in the binding interface, similar to the complementarity shown between antibodies and antigens. In addition, the binding interface is large; over 2000 angstroms squared of solvent accessible surface is buried by the binding. Overall binding takes place with very little conformational change in either protein. There are three clusters of residues on eVP24 which form contacts to KPNA. These are located at residue positions 115 to 140, 184 to 186, and 201 to 207. Mutation of any single residue does not significantly reduce the binding of eVP24 to KPNA which demonstrates the robust mechanism of the viral protein. KPNA proteins have 10 armadillo repeats each consisting of three alpha helices which determine their binding specificity, the second helix from ARM 9 and 10 form a hydrophobic core with helix 6 of eVP24 adding to the stability of the complex. The binding sites for eVP24 and STAT1 have been shown to overlap. Mutation in any one of four residues in KPNA at positions 434, 474, 477 or 484 prevent binding to STAT1. Similarly, the mutations in residues 474, 477 or 484 of KPNA reduce the binding of eVP24. Additionally and critically, the binding of eVP24 does not prevent the binding of cargo proteins with classical nuclear localization signals as, like STAT1, eVP24 causes very little conformational changes in KPNA.

== Effects on symptom progression ==
eVP24 acts as an antagonist to PY-STAT1 on KPNA. With eVP24 being transported to the nucleus instead of STAT1, the interferon-stimulated genes IFN-α/IFN-β and IFN-γ are disrupted and the cell does not enter an antiviral state. STAT1 has been shown to regulate the expression of certain immunoglobulins. More specifically, class switching from the predominant IgM to IgG2a was not present in STAT1-deficient cells. IgG2a plays a critical role in protection against pathogens and therefore without it, the cell is more susceptible to said pathogen. STAT1 has also been shown to regulate cell death by the inhibition of anti-apoptotic proteins Bcl-2 and Bcl-xL. STAT1 also induces the expression of procaspases, which are important factors in apoptosis signaling. When nuclear transport of STAT1 is inhibited pro-apoptotic signalling is disrupted, leading to decreased cell death.

== Current and future research ==
The evasion of the host cell immune system is key in to the rapid replication and dispersion through the body by the Ebola virus. Current research is exploring how eVP24 enables this phenomenon to occur. The discovery of STAT1 nuclear import disruption by eVP24 binding to KPNA has already provided scientists with one mechanism for the inhibition of the immune response in the cell. Other current Ebola research is focused on developing treatments or vaccines against the virus. Early investigations into potential vaccines showed that in mice models, the highest levels of protection occurred after vaccination with viral-like particles expressing eVP24. However, at that time the role of eVP24 was still largely unknown. In the wake of the 2014 Ebola outbreak in West Africa, the largest and deadliest outbreak to date, there has been a considerable increase in research focused on developing a vaccine for Ebola.
