= Scott Armstrong =

Scott Armstrong may refer to:

- J. Scott Armstrong (1937–2023), Wharton Business School professor
- Scott Armstrong (basketball) (1913–1997), American professional basketball player
- Scott Armstrong (journalist), former Washington Post journalist and author
- Scott Armstrong (politician) (born 1966), Canadian Member of Parliament
- Scott Armstrong (rugby union) (born 1986), rugby union player for Northampton Saints
- Scott Armstrong (wrestler) (born 1965), professional wrestler and referee
- Scott A. Armstrong, American oncologist
- Scott Armstrong, president and CEO of Group Health Cooperative

== See also ==
- Scot Armstrong (born 1970), American screenwriter and producer
