= William Mansfield Clark =

American professor of chemistry (1884–1964)

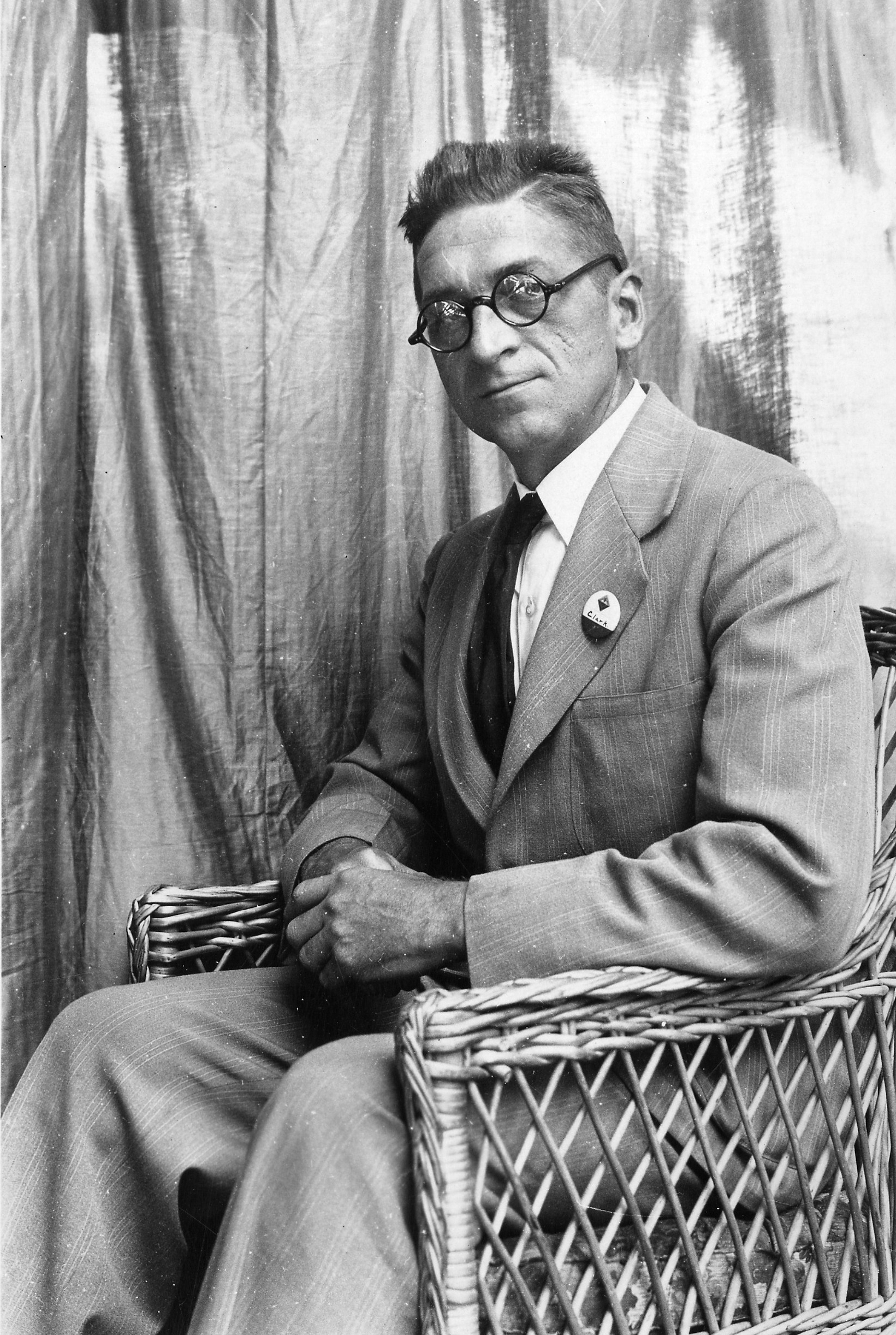
- Portrait from the Smithsonian Institution Archives
- Born: August 17, 1884
- Died: January 19, 1964 (aged 79)
- Education: The Hotchkiss School
- Alma mater: Williams College; Johns Hopkins University
- Father: James Starr Clark
- Awards: William H. Nichols Medal (1936); Borden Award (1944); Passano Award (1957)
- Scientific career
- Fields: Biochemistry
- Institutions: Johns Hopkins University School of Medicine; Harvard University; United States Department of Agriculture
- Academic advisors: Harmon Northrop Morse

William Mansfield Clark (17 August 1884 – 19 January 1964) was an American chemist and professor at the Johns Hopkins University. He studied oxidation-reduction reactions and was a pioneer of medical biochemistry.

Clark was born in Tivoli, New York, in a clergy family and studied at Hotchkiss School and Williams College before entering Johns Hopkins University, where he received a PhD in chemistry under H.N. Morse with a dissertation on A contribution to the investigation of the temperature coefficient of osmotic pressure: a redetermination of the osmotic pressures of cane sugar at 20°. He then worked on dairy bacteriology in the US department of agriculture followed by studies on oxidation reduction of dyes and metalloporphyrins at the Hygiene Laboratory, which he headed from 1920. He joined the Johns Hopkins Medical School as a professor of physiological chemistry in 1927. He was the President of both the Society of American Bacteriologists in 1933 and American Society of Biological Chemists in 1933–34. He was elected to the National Academy of Sciences in 1928 and to the American Philosophical Society in 1939.
