= Annual Review of Cancer Biology =

- Discipline: Oncology
- Language: English
- Edited by: Laura Attardi, Scott A. Armstrong.

Publication details
- History: 2017–present, 9 years old
- Publisher: Annual Reviews (US)
- Frequency: Annually
- Open access: Subscribe to Open
- Impact factor: 5.5 (2025)

Standard abbreviations
- ISO 4: Annu. Rev. Cancer Biol.

Indexing
- ISSN: 2472-3428
- OCLC no.: 1097264951

Links
- Journal homepage

The Annual Review of Cancer Biology is a peer-reviewed academic journal that publishes review articles about oncology. It published its first volume in 2017, making it the 47th journal published by Annual Reviews (AR). Founded by Tyler Jacks and Charles L. Sawyers, it is currently edited by Laura Attardi and Scott A. Armstrong. It is content is broadly focused on cancer cell biology, tumorigenesis and cancer progression, and translational cancer science. As of 2020, Annual Review of Cancer Biology has been published open access under the Subscribe to Open (S2O) publishing model.

== History ==
The Annual Review of Cancer Biology was first published in 2017, making it the 47th journal title published by Annual Reviews, a nonprofit organization whose stated mission is to synthesize knowledge "for the progress of science and the benefit of society." The stated goals of the journal were to cover the biology of tumor cells, the interaction between the tumor cells and host cells, cancer genomes, drugs for treating cancer, and the resistance of cancer to certain drugs. Each volume has three broad themes: cancer cell biology, tumorigenesis and cancer progression, and translational cancer science. Tyler Jacks and Charles L. Sawyers were the founding editors in 2017. They were succeeded in 2022 by Laura Attardi and Scott A. Armstrong.

As of 2026, Journal Citation Reports lists the journal's impact factor as 5.5, ranking it 76th of 333 journal titles in the category "Oncology". The journal is not published in print, and is only available electronically. Under AR's Subscribe to Open publishing model, the 2020 volume of Annual Review of Cancer Biology was published open access, a first for the journal.

== Editorial processes ==
The Annual Review of Cancer Biology is helmed by the editors. The editors are assisted by the editorial committee, which includes associate editors, regular members, and occasionally guest editors. Guest members participate at the invitation of the editors, and serve terms of one year. All other members of the editorial committee are appointed by the AR board of directors and serve five-year terms. The editorial committee determines which topics should be included in each volume and solicits reviews from qualified authors. Unsolicited manuscripts are not accepted. Peer review of accepted manuscripts is undertaken by the editorial committee.
