= Douglas C. Wallace =

American geneticist

Douglas Cecil Wallace
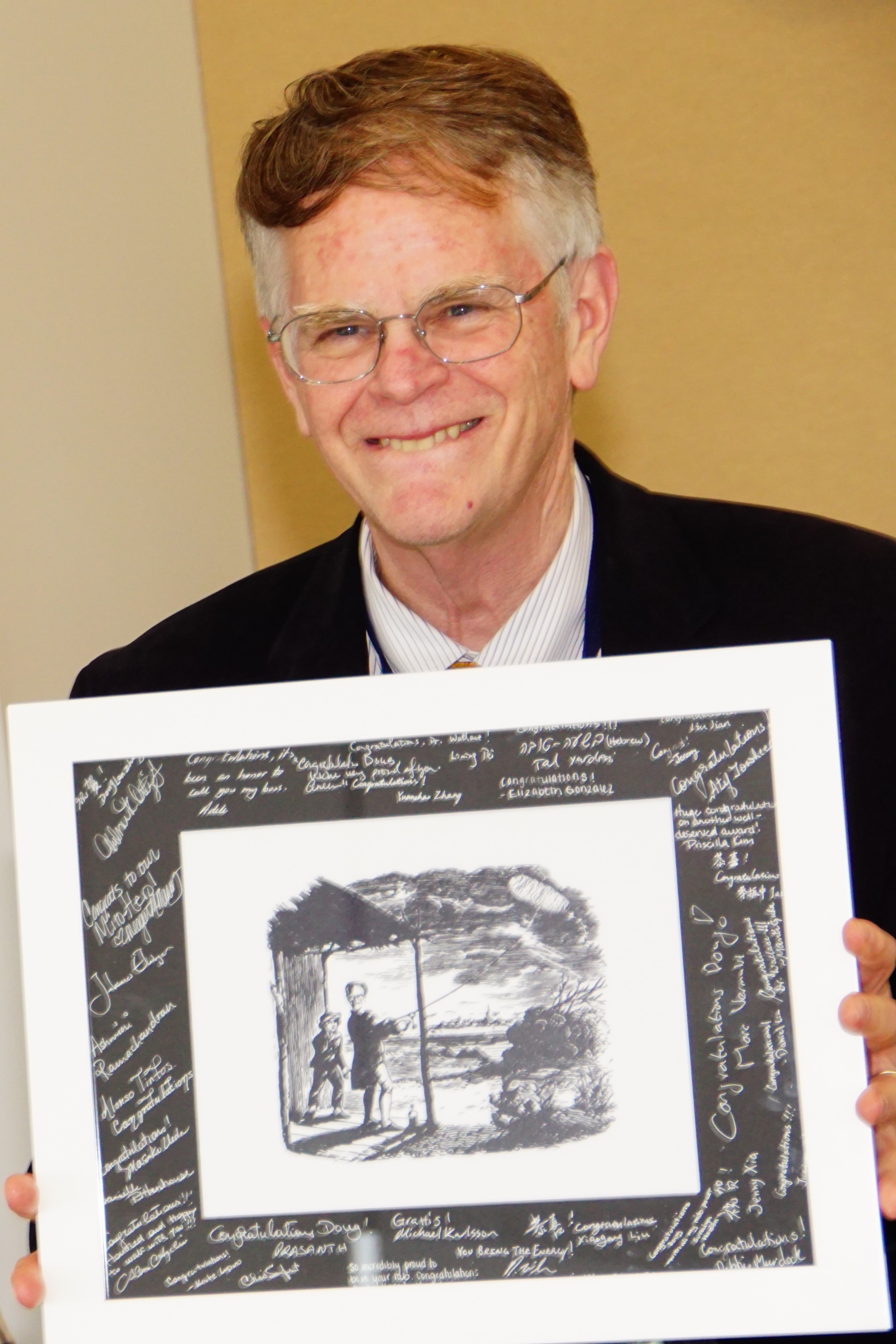
- Douglas Wallace with a gift from his team at the Children's Hospital of Philadelphia, 2017
- Born: November 6, 1946 (age 79); Cumberland, Maryland
- Education: Cornell University (B.S., 1968); Yale University (Ph.M., 1968) (Ph.D., 1975)
- Known for: Pioneering human mitochondrial genetics
- Spouse: Elizabeth (2 children)
- Awards: Passano Award (2000); Gruber Prize in Genetics (2012) Benjamin Franklin Life Sciences Medal
- Scientific career
- Fields: Human Genetics
- Institutions: Stanford University School of Medicine, Emory University, Human Genome Organisation, University of California, Irvine, Academia Sinica, University of Pennsylvania, Children's Hospital of Philadelphia
- Thesis: Cytoplasmic genetics in mammalian tissue culture cells
- Website: www.chop.edu/doctors/wallace-douglas-c

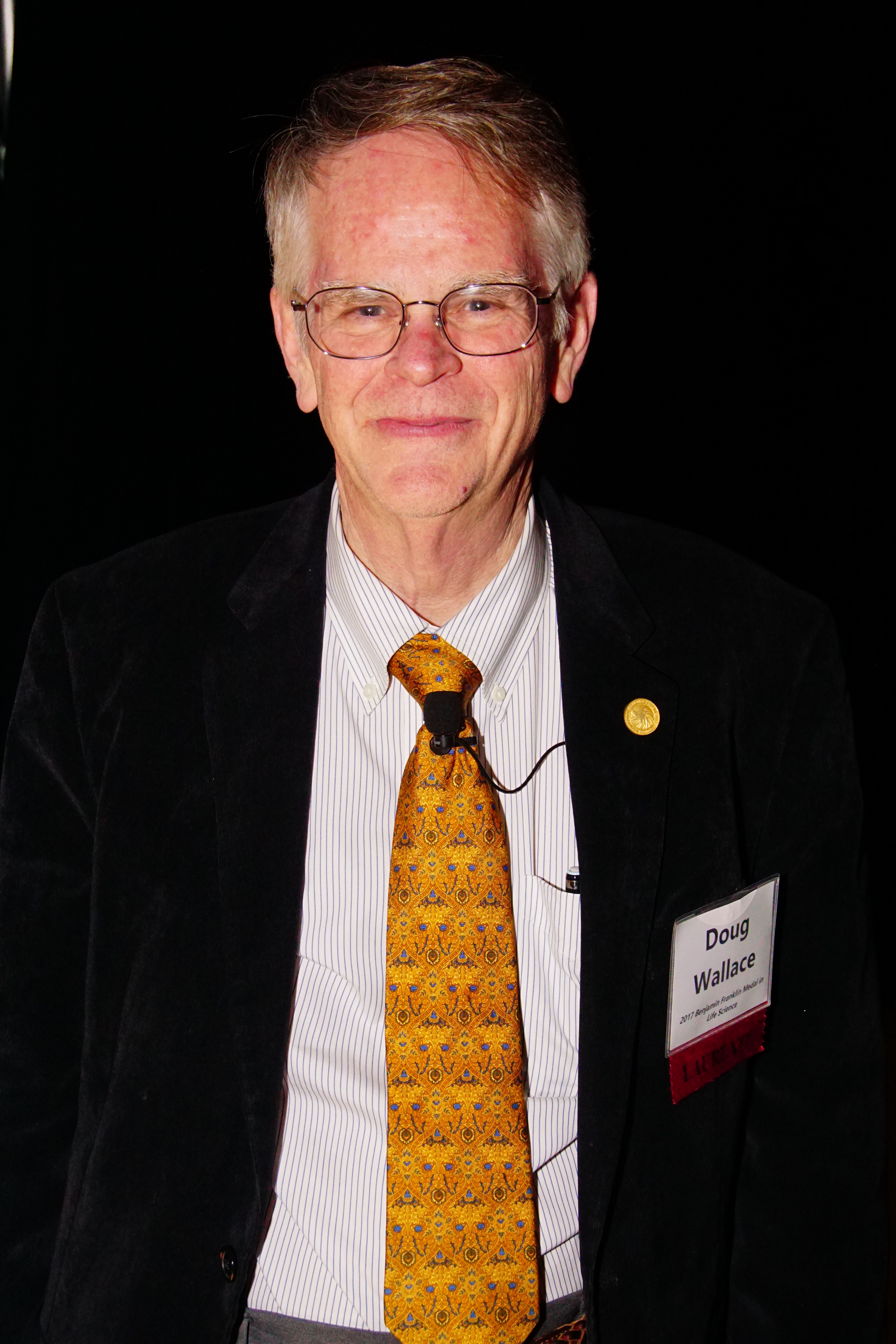
Douglas C. Wallace at the Benjamin Franklin Life Sciences Medal Symposium

Douglas Cecil Wallace (born November 6, 1946) is a geneticist and evolutionary biologist at the University of Pennsylvania and the Children's Hospital of Philadelphia in Pennsylvania. He pioneered the use of human mitochondrial DNA as a molecular marker.

== Career ==
Wallace earned a Bachelor of Science in Genetics and Developmental Biology at Cornell University in Ithaca, New York in 1968, a Master of Philosophy in Microbiology and Human Genetics at Yale University in New Haven, Connecticut in 1972 and a Ph.D. in Microbiology and Human Genetics at Yale University in 1975. His dissertation was titled Cytoplasmic genetics in mammalian tissue culture cells.

He remained at Yale University as a postdoctoral fellow until he was awarded a professorship (Assistant Professor) at the Stanford University School of Medicine in Stanford, California in 1976. In 1983 he became professor (Adjunct Professor) for Biochemistry, Anthropology and Pediatrics (Genetics) at Emory University in Atlanta, Georgia. From 1996 to 2002, he was Chairperson and Senior Editor of the Mitochondrial DNA Locus-Specific Database for the Human Genome Organisation (HUGO). In 2002 he assumed a professorship of Molecular Genetics at the University of California, Irvine where he founded the Center for Molecular and Mitochondrial Medicine and Genetics. In 2006 he was awarded a visiting professorship at Academia Sinica in Taipei, Taiwan. In 2010 he became professor of Pathology and Laboratory Medicine at the University of Pennsylvania in Philadelphia and became the founding director of the Center for Mitochondrial and Epigenomic Medicine at the Children's Hospital of Philadelphia.

In June 2022 he was awarded an honorary degree in Medicine and Surgery by the University of Padua, Italy.

== Work ==
Wallace is a pioneer in the study of mitochondrial DNA. Wallace and his colleagues introduced human mitochondrial genetics into the field of molecular genetics. In 1975, Wallace was the first to associate a genetic disorder with a specific mitochondrial DNA region (resistance to chloramphenicol), and in 1990 he described a mitochondrial DNA mutation as the cause of a particular form of myoclonic epilepsy. He has been instrumental in the study of the mitochondrial genome and has developed new methods for the analysis of mitochondrial DNA.

Wallace and his colleagues demonstrated that human mitochondrial DNA is inherited exclusively from the mother and they reconstructed the origin and ancient migration patterns of women using variations in mitochondrial DNA sequences.

== Honours and awards ==
- 1995 Membership of the National Academy of Sciences
- 1999 Metlife Foundation Award for Medical Research in Alzheimer's Disease
- 2000 Passano Award (jointly with Giuseppe Attardi)
- 2004 Membership of the American Academy of Arts and Sciences
- 2009 Membership of the Institute of Medicine
- 2012 Gruber Prize in Genetics
- 2017 Benjamin Franklin Life Sciences Medal
- 2017 Dr. Paul Janssen Award for Biomedical Research
- 2022 Honorary Degree in Medicine and Surgery by the University of Padua
- 2025 Beering Award

== See also ==
- Recent African origin of modern humans
- Mitochondrial Eve
