= Alfred L. Goldberg =

American cell biologist-biochemist (1942–2023)

- Born: September 3, 1942; Providence, Rhode Island, US
- Died: April 18, 2023 (aged 80)
- Education: Harvard University (BA, PhD); University of Cambridge
- Known for: mechanisms of controlled protein degradation utilizing proteasomes
- Spouse: Joan Helpern Goldberg
- Children: Aaron Goldberg
- Awards: Warren Alpert Foundation Prize
- Scientific career
- Fields: Cell biology; Multiple myeloma; Velcade (Bortezomib); Muscle atrophy
- Workplaces: American Academy of Arts & Sciences; National Academy of Medicine; National Academy of Sciences; American Physiological Society; Cambridge University; Harvard Medical School; University of California (Berkeley); Institut Pasteur; St John's College, Cambridge

Alfred Lewis Goldberg (September 3, 1942 – April 18, 2023) was an American cell biologist-biochemist and professor at Harvard University. His major discoveries have concerned the mechanisms and physiological importance of protein degradation in cells.

== Early life and career ==
Goldberg was born in Providence, Rhode Island into a Jewish family on September 3, 1942, the son of Mr. and Mrs. Philip Goldberg. He graduated from Harvard College in 1963 magna cum laude in Biochemical Sciences (where he did his honor’s research in the laboratory of James Watson). He then spent a year as a Churchill Scholar at Cambridge University, where he studied physiology, before becoming a medical student at Harvard. After two years, he transferred to the Harvard Graduate School and in 1968 received his PhD in Physiology for studies in the laboratory of HM Goodman. He then joined the faculty at Harvard Medical School and rose to become full Professor of Physiology in 1977 and since 1993 Professor of Cell Biology. He also held visiting professorships at University of California (Berkeley) (1976), Institut Pasteur (Paris) (1995), and St John's College, Cambridge (2012).

== Research career ==
In the 1960s, when Goldberg began his research career, there was little interest in protein degradation. However, as a graduate student, Goldberg showed that the loss of muscle mass upon denervation or fasting occurred primarily through acceleration of protein degradation. As an assistant professor, he decided to focus on this neglected area, and his early studies in E. coli and reticulocytes first demonstrated that cells rapidly degrade misfolded proteins as arise through mutations and errors in protein synthesis. These studies defined for the first time many of the key features of intracellular protein degradation, especially its role in protein quality control in eliminating aggregation-prone proteins and its requirement for metabolic energy (ATP).

At that time, the lysosome was believed to be the only site for protein degradation in cells. However, in 1977, his lab demonstrated that the rapid breakdown of misfolded proteins in reticulocytes is catalyzed by a non-lysosomal, ATP-dependent system, now called the Ubiquitin Proteasome System. The seminal studies of Hershko, Ciechanover, and Irwin Rose on these preparations uncovered the role of ubiquitination in marking such proteins for degradation. Simultaneously, Goldberg and coworkers discovered that protein degradation in bacteria, which lack ubiquitin, and mitochondria involves a new type of enzyme, ATP hydrolyzing protease complexes (protease Lon/La, ClpAP, HslUV). They went on to describe their novel mechanisms and induction in stressful states.

In 1987, his laboratory and Rechsteiner’s described the much larger ATP-dependent proteolytic complex that degrades ubiquitinated proteins in reticulocytes. He named it the 26S proteasome to distinguish it from the smaller particle, which he named the 20S proteasome, and which they later showed comprises the proteolytic activity of the 26S complex. Their subsequent studies defined many of the proteasome’s novel biochemical features, especially its ATP-dependent mechanism, peptide products, and cellular functions. Their recent research has shown that cellular rates of degradation are controlled in part by regulation of 26S proteasome activity, including by protein kinases.

Of major scientific and medical impact was his lab’s development of proteasome inhibitors that block degradation in cells. In collaboration with a small biotech company (Myogenics/Proscript), which he founded, they introduced in 1994 the inhibitor, MG132, which has been used in many thousands of publications and has enabled major advances in knowledge about the importance of protein degradation. In introducing these inhibitors, they showed that the proteasome is the major site for protein breakdown in normal cells, is critical in activation of inflammatory responses, and is the source of most antigen peptides presented on surface MHC Class 1 molecules, which is critical in immune defense against viruses and cancer. His long collaboration with Ken Rock further elucidated this process, identified the unique properties of the proteasomes in immune tissues, and defined the roles of cellular peptidases (especially ERAP1) in further processing proteasome products so they fit into MHC Class 1 molecules. Most importantly, Goldberg’s efforts initiated the development by the company of proteasome inhibitor Bortezomib/Velcade, which is used worldwide to treat the common hematological cancer, multiple myeloma. Over 600,000 patients have now been treated with proteasome inhibitors, which have extended their life spans and improved their quality of life.

Another area where the Goldberg lab has made major contributions concerns the cellular mechanisms of muscle atrophy. His lab first identified factors that suppress muscle protein degradation (e.g., insulin) or enhance it (e.g., disuse, cancer cachexia), and subsequently showed that various types of muscle wasting occur through transcription of a common set of atrophy-related genes (atrogenes). They also identified the critical transcription factor triggering this atrophy program (FoxO3) and elucidated the mechanisms that disassemble the muscles’ contractile apparatus during atrophy.

== Personal life and death ==
In 1970, Goldberg married Joan Marilyn Helpern, a physician (hematologist). They had two children: Aaron Goldberg, a well-known jazz pianist, and Julie B. Goldberg, a software engineer.

Alfred L. Goldberg died on April 18, 2023, at the age of 80.

== Professional honors ==
- Member of the American Academy of Arts & Sciences (2005)
- Member of the National Academy of Medicine (2009)
- Member of the National Academy of Sciences (2015)
- Fellow of the American Physiological Society (2015)
- Honorary DSc. Degree Watson School of Biology (Cold Spring Harbor Laboratory) (2009)
- Honorary DSc. Degree Maastricht University (Netherlands) (2011)
- Honorary DSc. Degree University of Barcelona (Spain) (2014)
- Novartis-Drew University Award in Biochemical Science (with T. Maniatis & A. Varshavsky) (1998)
- Knobil Prize for Medical Research (Univ Texas School of Medicine, 2007)
- Gabbay Award for Biotechnology & Medicine (Brandeis University, 2008)
- Warren Alpert Foundation Prize, Harvard Medical School (with J. Adams, K. Anderson, P. Richardson) (2012)
- Ernest Beutler Prize for Basic Science, American Society of Hematology (2015)
- Passano Prize for Medical Research (Johns Hopkins University, 2021)
- Symposium honoring Dr. Goldberg’s “Pioneering contributions to muscle metabolism”, Cachexia Society (Chicago, 2004)
- Symposium on "Protein Modification and Degradation" honoring Dr. Goldberg’s 65th Birthday, Chinese Academy of Medical Sciences (Beijing, 2007)

== Prize Lectureships ==
- Francis McNaughton Lecture, McGill University-Montreal-Neurological Institute (1997)
- Bathsheva Rothchild Memorial Lecture, Israel Academy of Sciences (1998)
- Leonardo da Vinci Lecture, San Raffaelle Med School, Milan, Italy (2002)
- Fred Fay Memorial Lecture, University of Massachusetts Medical School (2003)
- Severo Ochoa Prize Lecture, New York University (2004)
- Nobel Forum Lecture, Karolinska Institute (Sweden) (2005)
- Centennial Lecture, Biochemical Society, England (2006)
- Cristofalo Prize Lecture, Aging Institute (University of Pennsylvania) (2015)
- Benevuto Prize Lecture, MD Anderson Cancer Center Univ. Texas Medical Center (Houston) (2019)

== Influential publications ==
- Goldberg, AL (1972). "Degradation of abnormal proteins in Escherichia coli (protein breakdown-protein structure-mistranslation-amino acid analogs-puromycin)". Proc Natl Acad Sci U S A. 69 (2): 422–6. doi:10.1073/pnas.69.2.422. PMC 426471. PMID 4551144.
- Prouty, WF; Goldberg, AL (1972). "Fate of abnormal proteins in E. coli accumulation in intracellular granules before catabolism". Nat New Biol. 240 (100): 147–50. doi:10.1038/newbio240147a0. PMID 4565695.
- Goldberg, AL; St (1976). "Part 2". Annu Rev Biochem. 45: 747–803. doi:10.1146/annurev.bi.45.070176.003531. PMID 786161.
- Goldberg, AL; Dice, JF (1974). "Intracellular protein degradation in mammalian and bacterial cells". Annu Rev Biochem. 43: 835–69. doi:10.1146/annurev.bi.43.070174.004155. PMID 4604628.
- Goldberg, AL (2003). "Protein degradation and protection against misfolded or damaged proteins". Nature. 426 (6968): 895–9. Bibcode:2003Natur.426..895G. doi:10.1038/nature02263. PMID 14685250.
- Etlinger, JD; Goldberg, AL (January 1977). "A soluble ATP-dependent proteolytic system responsible for the degradation of abnormal proteins in reticulocytes". Proc Natl Acad Sci U S A. 74 (1): 54–8. Bibcode:1977PNAS...74...54E. doi:10.1073/pnas.74.1.54. PMC 393195. PMID 264694.
- Chung, CH; Goldberg, AL (August 1981). "The product of the lon (capR) gene in Escherichia coli is the ATP-dependent protease, protease La". Proc Natl Acad Sci U S A. 78 (8): 4931–5. Bibcode:1981PNAS...78.4931C. doi:10.1073/pnas.78.8.4931. PMC 320299. PMID 6458037.
- Tanaka, K; Waxman, L; Goldberg, AL (1983). "ATP serves two distinct roles in protein degradation in reticulocytes, one requiring and one independent of ubiquitin". J Cell Biol. 96 (6): 1580–1585. doi:10.1083/jcb.96.6.1580. PMC 2112434. PMID 6304111.
- Goff, SA; Goldberg, AL (1985). "Production of abnormal proteins in E. coli stimulates transcription of lon and other heat shock genes". Cell. 41 (2): 587–95. doi:10.1016/s0092-8674(85)80031-3. PMID 3886165.
- Waxman, L; Fagan, JM; Goldberg, AL (1987). "Demonstration of two distinct high molecular weight proteases in rabbit reticulocytes, one of which degrades ubiquitin conjugates". J Biol Chem. 262 (6): 2451–7. doi:10.1016/S0021-9258(18)61525-X. PMID 3029081.
- Hwang, BJ; Park, WJ; Chung, CH; Goldberg, AL (August 1987). "Escherichia coli contains a soluble ATP-dependent protease (Ti) distinct from protease La". Proc Natl Acad Sci U S A. 84 (16): 5550–4. Bibcode:1987PNAS...84.5550H. doi:10.1073/pnas.84.16.5550. PMC 298900. PMID 3303028.
- Gaczynska, M; Rock, KL; Goldberg, AL (1993). "Gamma-interferon and expression of MHC genes regulate peptide hydrolysis by proteasomes". Nature. 365 (6443): 264–7. Bibcode:1993Natur.365..264G. doi:10.1038/365264a0. PMID 8396732.
- Rock, KL; Gramm, C; Rothstein, L; Clark, K; Stein, R; Dick, L; Hwang, D; Goldberg, AL (1994). "Inhibitors of the proteasome block the degradation of most cell proteins and the generation of peptides presented on MHC class I molecules". Cell. 78 (5): 761–71. doi:10.1016/s0092-8674(94)90462-6. PMID 8087844.
- Palombella, VJ; Rando, OJ; Goldberg, AL; Maniatis, T (1994). "The ubiquitin- proteasome pathway is required for processing the NFkB1 precursor protein and the activation of NF-kB". Cell. 78: 773–785. doi:10.1016/S0092-8674(94)90482-0. PMID 8087845.
- Goldberg, AL; Gaczynska, M; Grant, E; Michalek, M; Rock, KL (1995). "Functions of the proteasome in antigen presentation". Cold Spring Harb Symp Quant Biol. 60: 479–90. doi:10.1101/sqb.1995.060.01.052. PMID 8824421.
- Rock, KL; Goldberg, AL (1999). "Degradation of cell proteins and the generation of MHC class I-presented peptides". Annu Rev Immunol. 17: 739–79. doi:10.1146/annurev.immunol.17.1.739. PMID 10358773.
- Goldberg, AL (2012). "Development of proteasome inhibitors as research tools and cancer drugs". J Cell Biol. 199 (4): 583–8. doi:10.1083/jcb.201210077. PMC 3494858. PMID 23148232.
- Coux, O; Tanaka, K; Goldberg, AL (1996). "Structure and functions of the 20S and 26S proteasomes". Annu Rev Biochem. 65: 801–47. doi:10.1146/annurev.bi.65.070196.004101. PMID 8811196.
- Smith, DM; Chang, SC; Park, S; Finley, D; Cheng, Y; Goldberg, AL (September 2007). "Docking of the proteasomal ATPases' carboxyl termini in the 20S proteasome's alpha ring opens the gate for substrate entry". Mol. Cell. 27 (5): 731–44. doi:10.1016/j.molcel.2007.06.033. PMC 2083707. PMID 17803938.
- Smith, DM; Fraga, H; Reis, C; Kafri, G; Goldberg, AL (2011). "ATP binds to proteasomal ATPases in pairs with distinct functional effects, implying an ordered reaction cycle". Cell. 144 (4): 526–38. doi:10.1016/j.cell.2011.02.005. PMC 3063399. PMID 21335235.
- Mitch, WE; Goldberg, AL (1996). "Mechanisms of muscle wasting. The role of the ubiquitin-proteasome pathway". N Engl J Med. 335 (25): 1897–905. doi:10.1056/NEJM199612193352507. PMID 8948566.
- Lecker, SH; Jagoe, RT; Gilbert, A; Gomes, M; Baracos, V; et al. (January 2004). "Multiple types of skeletal muscle atrophy involve a common program of changes in gene expression". FASEB J. 18 (1): 39–51. doi:10.1096/fj.03-0610com. PMID 14718385.
- Sandri, M; Sandri, C; Gilbert, A; Skurk, C; Calabria, E; Picard, A; Walsh, K; Schiaffino, S; Lecker, SH; Goldberg, AL (2004). "Foxo transcription factors induce the atrophy-related ubiquitin ligase atrogin-1 and cause skeletal muscle atrophy". Cell. 117 (3): 399–412. doi:10.1016/s0092-8674(04)00400-3. PMC 3619734. PMID 15109499.
- Cohen, S; Nathan, JA; Goldberg, AL (January 2015). "Muscle wasting in disease: molecular mechanisms and promising therapies". Nat Rev Drug Discov. 14 (1): 58–74. doi:10.1038/nrd4467. PMID 25549588.
- Lokireddy, S; Kukushkin, NV; Goldberg, AL (2015). "cAMP-induced phosphorylation of 26S proteasomes on Rpn6/PSMD11 enhances their activity and the degradation of misfolded proteins". Proc Natl Acad Sci U S A. 112 (52): E7176-85. Bibcode:2015PNAS..112E7176L. doi:10.1073/pnas.1522332112. PMC 4702992. PMID 26669444.
- VerPlank, JJS; Lokireddy, S; Zhao, J; Goldberg, AL (2019). "26S Proteasomes are rapidly activated by diverse hormones and physiological states that raise cAMP and cause Rpn6 phosphorylation". Proc Natl Acad Sci U S A. 116 (10): 4228–4237. Bibcode:2019PNAS..116.4228V. doi:10.1073/pnas.1809254116. PMC 6410790. PMID 30782827.
- VerPlank, JJS; Tyrkalska, SD; Fleming, A; Rubinsztein, DC; Goldberg, AL (2020). "cGMP via PKG activates 26S proteasomes and enhances degradation of proteins, including ones that cause neurodegenerative diseases". Proc Natl Acad Sci U S A. 117 (25): 14220–14230. Bibcode:2020PNAS..11714220V. doi:10.1073/pnas.2003277117. PMC 7321992. PMID 32513741.
