= Mitchell Kronenberg =

American immunologist

- Born: December 12, 1951 (age 74)
- Education: Columbia University; California Institute of Technology
- Scientific career
- Fields: Immunology
- Workplaces: University of California, Los Angeles; La Jolla Institute for Immunology

Mitchell Kronenberg (born December 12, 1951) is an American immunologist and the chief scientific officer at the La Jolla Institute for Immunology. He served as president of the institute from 2003 to 2021.

== Education ==
Kronenberg received his Bachelor of Science degree from Columbia University in 1973 and a Ph.D. from the California Institute of Technology, where he stayed on to complete postdoctoral work in the laboratory of Leroy Hood.

== Scientific career ==
In 1986, Kronenberg joined the faculty at UCLA, where he rose through the ranks and was promoted to full professor in 1997. In 1997, he moved to La Jolla Institute for Immunology (LJI) to head the Division of Developmental Immunology. He was appointed president and chief scientific officer of LJI in 2003.

Kronenberg is an adjunct professor of Biology at UC San Diego and co-directs the program in Immunology, a collaborative effort between the La Jolla Institute and UC San Diego. During his leadership, LJI formalized its ties with UC San Diego, maintained its relationship with Kyowa Kirin, expanded its core facilities and technologic prowess, increased its budget four-fold and grew in reputation.

From 2009 to 2015, he was also the secretary-treasurer of the American Association of Immunologists. He advises many organizations, including the National Cancer Institute on the Board of Scientific Counselors.

== Research ==
The Kronenberg lab focuses on understanding innate-like lymphocytes, mainly natural killer T (NKT) cells, a subset of T cells that recognizes glycolipids and is involved in a variety of immune responses including autoimmune, anti-tumoral responses and antimicrobial responses. Kronenberg also has research in mucosal immunology and on the development of inflammatory bowel diseases.

Kronenberg's work had a major impact in defining how glycolipid antigens are taken into cells and processed in lysosomes and unraveled the intracellular traffic of CD1d, which is the MHC class I molecule that presents lipid antigens. He has led the field in defining microbial antigens from environmental bacteria and from pathogenic microbes for mouse and human NKT cells, characterizing the biochemistry of antigen recognition, and has shown that NKT cells are protective in Lyme disease and pneumonia. In the mucosal immune system, major findings from the Kronenberg laboratory have identified functions of another MHC class I antigen presenting molecule expressed in intestine epithelium, the Thymus Leukemia antigen. His work has determined how the balance of regulatory versus pro-inflammatory responses occurs, with breakthroughs in understanding the roles of retinoic acid and IL-10. Recently, they demonstrated that HVEM, a TNF receptor homolog, has enormous influence on the mucosal immune response by triggering protective innate anti-microbial responses against important pathogens by innate lymphoid cells type 3 (ILC3) and epithelial cells in the intestine.

== Awards ==
Kronenberg was elected a fellow of the American Association for the Advancement of Science in 2015. He received the Distinguished Service Award from the American Association of Immunologists (AAI) and was elected a Distinguished Fellow of the AAI in 2019. He was elected as a member of the American Academy of Arts and Sciences in 2026

== Personal life ==
Kronenberg is married to Hilde Cheroutre, also a professor at La Jolla Institute and they have collaborated on a number of studies.
