= Universal Music Japan =

Japanese subsidiary of Universal Music Group

Coordinates: 35°40′14.8692″N 139°42′24.33894″E

Universal Music LLC
- Logo in use since January 2020

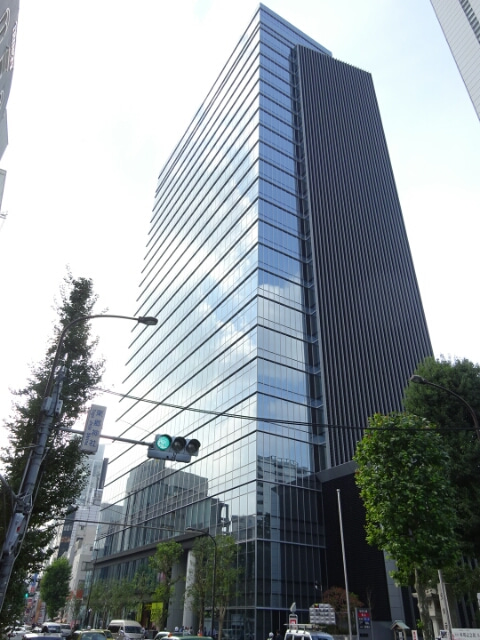
- Jingumae Tower Building, Universal Music Japan's headquarters in Tokyo
- Native name: ユニバーサル ミュージック
- Romanized name: Yunibāsaru myūjikku
- Formerly: PolyGram Co., Ltd. (1990–1999); Universal Music Co., Ltd. (1999–2009)
- Type: Subsidiary
- Industry: Music; Entertainment
- Founded: April 20, 1990; 36 years ago
- Headquarters: 1-5-8 Jingumae, Shibuya, Tokyo, Japan
- Area served: East Asia
- Key people: Naoshi Fujikura (president and CEO); Keiichi Ishizaka (former president)
- Products: Music and entertainment
- Revenue: See Universal Music Group
- Total equity: ¥295.2 million (US$2.69 million) (2021)
- Number of employees: 550
- Parent: Universal Music Group
- Divisions: List of Universal Music Japan labels
- Subsidiaries: Universal Music Creative; Office Augusta; Universal Music Artists; Universal Music Publishing Japan; Nine by Nine (50%)
- Website: www.universal-music.co.jp

Universal Music LLC (Japanese: ユニバーサル ミュージック合同会社, Hepburn: Yunibāsaru myūjikku Gōdō gaisha), often referred to as just Universal Music Japan or UMJ, is a Japanese subsidiary of the Universal Music Group founded in 1990. It is the largest subsidiary for a foreign company in Japan regarding music distribution. The company is responsible for marketing and distribution in Japan for Japanese releases under Universal.

As of 2019, Universal Japan holds the second most shares in the Japanese music market, behind Sony Music Entertainment Japan, and is followed by Avex.

== History ==
=== Early years ===
The company was founded as PolyGram Co., Ltd. in 1990 with Koike Kazuhiko serving as president and CEO. In 1999, the company was restructured and renamed as Universal Music Co., Ltd., following Seagram's acquisition of PolyGram, and its subsequent integration into Universal Studios.

=== 2009–2013: Renaming to Universal Music LLC ===
In 2009, the company was renamed as Universal Music LLC. Kazuhiko stepped down as CEO and Keiichi Ishizaka became CEO and president of the company.

=== 2013–2014: Restructure following EMI purchase ===
In 2011, EMI agreed to sell its recorded music operations to Universal Music Group for £1.2 billion ($1.9 billion) and its music publishing operations to a Sony-led consortium for $2.2 billion. Among the other companies that had competed for the recorded music business was Warner Music Group which was reported to have made a $2 billion bid. Universal Music Group completed their acquisition of EMI on September 28, 2012. In 2012, Ishizaka became CEO of EMI Music Japan while Universal Japan was scheduled to hold a corporate swap in response of the merger. EMI Music Japan officially was absorbed into Universal Japan, became defunct as a company with EMI Records Japan as a successor to the EMI Music Japan label. Nine months after the merger, Ishizaka stepped down from his position of CEO from Universal Japan, and became a non-executive chairman. His successor, Naoshi Fujikura was appointed in 2014. In April 2014, Universal Japan was once again restructured. Many of its labels were rebranded and split multiple times, including EMI Records Japan which de-merged into two sublabels EMI Records and Virgin Records of which the latter rebranded as EMI R and then merged with Delicious Deli Records to form Virgin Music.

=== 2015–2022: New business model, push for streaming and worldwide distribution ===
In December 2015, Fujikura announced that Universal Japan "is a new business" and that the company would adopt a new business model to strengthen business. These changes were effective as of January 1, 2016. A new label, Universal-W was established in December 2015 with Japanese company Warlock.

In August 2016, Radwimps released the soundtrack for the 2016 Japanese animated film Your Name. The album was a commercial success in Japan and in a rare feat, charted in the United States in 2017. In December of the same year, Universal Japan acquired Office Augusta, a music management agency (founded in 1992), and made it a fully owned subsidiary; as a result, the latter's "Augusta Records" label became an affiliated label of Universal Japan.

In 2017, the company announced it would relocate from Minato, Tokyo to the Jingumae Tower Building in Shibuya, Tokyo. The relocation took place from September 15, 2018, to October 9. In December 2017, Universal Japan announced they suspended the contract of Hilcrhyme member DJ Katsu following his arrest of possession of marijuana. He subsequently left the group following his arrest and the group lost their recording contract.

In June 2018, Universal Japan announced an exclusive license agreement with Disney Music Group.

In 2019, Universal Japan suspended the sales of Junnosuke Taguchi's discography and removed his releases from digital stores following his arrest of possession of marijuana.

In 2020, Universal Japan updated their corporate logo to match the same logo used by the main Universal Music Group company. In that same year, Universal launched the Virgin Music Label and Artist Services. The service was launched in many Universal subsidiaries, including Universal Japan.

In 2021, Yoshimoto Music signed a distribution deal with Universal Japan for future releases. In July 2021, CEO and president Fujikura was listed on Billboard's International Power Players list. In an interview with Billboard Japan, Fujikura shared about his measures on increasing streaming revenue and strategies to have Universal Japan artists chart overseas. Universal Japan has since released previous releases of former and current artists under their labels worldwide digitally, including Hikaru Utada, Crystal Kay, Radwimps, Mrs. Green Apple, Che'Nelle and Ai.

=== 2022–present: Company restructure, acquirement of A-Sketch, relaunch of Polydor and Capitol Records ===
In 2022, Fujikura was listed on Billboard's International Power Players list for a second year in a row. Fujikura became the first Japanese executive to appear on the list three times, including his first recognition in 2019. In an interview, Fujikura discussed plans for creating new marketplaces in Japan and developing them overseas, particularly in the United States. In September 2022, Travis Japan signed a record deal with Capitol Records, with distribution and marketing being handled by Universal Japan. In October 2022, following the success of Uta's Songs: One Piece Film Red, Ado signed a record deal with Geffen Records alongside her current record deal with Virgin Music.

In December 2022, Universal Japan announced an organization change, effective on January 1, 2023. Universal J, which was founded in 2002, was split into two labels, UJ and Polydor Records. Imprints from Universal J including Johnny's Universe and Top J Records were transferred to UJ. The company also announced Augusta Records would become an imprint of Universal Sigma.

In April 2023, Fujikura was listed on the Billboard International Power Players list for a third year in a row. In July 2023, Universal Japan announced a new imprint label under EMI, Holo-n, in partnership with Japanese virtual YouTuber agency Hololive Production.

In January 2024, Universal Japan announced personnel changes for Virgin Music and Office Augusta. DRC LLC was renamed to Universal Music Creative LLC following an organizational change. In May, Fujikura was listed on the Billboard International Power Players list for a fourth consecutive year. Including his initial listing in 2019, Fujikura became the first Japanese CEO to appear on the Power Players list five times total.

In February 2025, Universal Japan acquired A-Sketch from Amuse Inc. for an undisclosed amount. Later in July, the company launched an English education platform, UM English Lab. In November 2025, an unknown amount of personal data was leaked from the Universal Music Store, an online store operated by Universal Japan.

Following an organizational change in January 2026, Universal Japan relaunched Capitol Records as an imprint of Virgin Music, more than ten years after the original label went defunct following EMI Japan's absorption into Universal Japan. In April 2026, Universal Japan announced the launch of the company Nine by Nine, a joint venture with Sony Music Entertainment Japan.

== Labels ==
=== Current labels ===
- Polydor Records
  - Perfume Records (Note: Private label for Perfume.)
  - Asse!! Records (Note: Private label for HY.)
  - Utahime Records (Note: Private label for Akina Nakamori; formerly under Universal Sigma until 2023.)
- UJ (Note: Joint venture label in partnership with Starto Entertainment.)
  - Over the Top (Note: Private label for Timelesz.)
  - TJ Project (Note: Private label for Travis Japan.)
  - Project K&P (Note: Private label for King & Prince.)
- Universal Sigma
  - A&M Records
  - DCT Records (Note: Private label for Dreams Come True.)
  - Hehn Records (Note: Private label for Fujii Kaze.)
  - U Cube (Note: Joint venture label in partnership with Cube Entertainment.)
  - Yoshimoto Universal Tunes (Note: Joint venture label in partnership with Yoshimoto Kogyo.)
- Lighthouse Music
- Universal D
- EMI Records
  - Holo-n (Note: Joint venture label in partnership with Hololive Production.)
  - Eastworld (Note: Formerly a label division of EMI Music Japan, which merged with Universal Music Japan in 2012.)
  - Go Good Records (Note: Private label for Jin Akanishi.)
  - Mercury Tokyo
- Universal Gear
- Virgin Music
  - Capitol Records
  - Def Jam Recordings
  - Kinashi Records (Note: Private label for Noritake Kinashi.)
  - Republic Records
- USM Japan
  - Universal International
  - UM & Brands
- Augusta Records (Note: A label division of Office Augusta, which became a Universal Music Japan company in 2016.)
  - Augtunes (Note: Formerly Atsuga Records.)
  - Augment Records (Note: Joint venture label in partnership with Avex Inc.)
  - Newborder Recordings
- Universal Classics and Jazz
- Be-U (Note: Joint venture label in partnership with Be My Self Group (BMSG).)
- A-Sketch (Note: Joint venture label in partnership with KDDI; became a Universal Music Japan company in 2025.)
  - Astro Voice
  - DMM Music (Note: Joint venture label in partnership with DMM.com.)
- Univolt (Note: Joint venture label in partnership with Nova.)

=== Former labels ===
- Delicious Deli Records
- EMI Records Japan
- Island Records
- EMI R
- Nayutawave Records
- Virgin Records
- Universal Victor
- Nippon Phonogram
- Mercury Music Entertainment
- Kitty Records
- Zero-A
- Far Eastern Tribe Records
- Universal-W
- Universal J
- Zen Music
- Universal Music IST

== See also ==
- List of record labels
- EMI Music Japan
- Category:Universal Music Japan artists
