= Laura Attardi =

American biochemist and cancer researcher

- Education: Cornell University; University of California at Berkeley
- Father: Giuseppe Attardi
- Scientific career
- Institutions: Stanford University
- Doctoral advisor: Robert Tjian
- Website: www.med.stanford.edu/attardilab.html

External videos
- “Stanford Faculty - Meet Laura Attardi", August 19, 2015

Laura Attardi is the Catharine and Howard Avery Professor of the school of medicine, and professor of radiation oncology and genetics at Stanford University where she leads the Attardi Laboratory. Attardi studies the tumor suppressor protein p53 and the gene that encodes it, TP53, to better understand mechanisms for preventing cancer.

== Early life and education ==
Laura Donatella Attardi is the daughter of biologists Giuseppe Attardi and Barbara Furman.

Laura Attardi received her BA in biochemistry from Cornell University in 1988. She earned her PhD in molecular and cell biology from the University of California at Berkeley in 1994, working with Robert Tjian. She then did postdoctoral work at Massachusetts Institute of Technology with Tyler Jacks.

== Career ==
In 2000, Attardi joined Stanford University School of Medicine in the departments of radiation oncology and genetics. Attardi is the Catharine and Howard Avery Professor of the school of medicine, and professor of radiation oncology and genetics at Stanford University She serves as a Program Director of the Cancer Biology and Cancer Stem Cells Program at Stanford Cancer Institute.

Attardi is co-editor of the Annual Review of Cancer Biology and a member of the editorial board of the Journal of Cell Biology.

== Research ==
Attardi studies the tumor suppressor protein p53 and the gene that encodes it, TP53. TP53 is the most frequently mutated gene (>50%) in human cancer, suggesting that it has a key role in preventing cancer formation. The cellular mechanisms and transcriptional programs involved in p53 activation are complicated. There is evidence that p53 can suppress tumors, but it can also cause toxicity in normal tissues. Understanding the activity of p53 and how to restore p53 function may lead to advances in anti-cancer therapeutics. Attardi's goal is to understand the mechanisms of p53 and its actions and effects in different settings.

With Colleen A. Brady and others, Attardi developed knock-in mice with transactivation mutations in the two transactivation domains (TADs) to compromise p53 gene transactivation. The p53 transactivation mutant L25Q:W26S (p5325,26) affected the first TAD, while F53Q;F54S (p5353,54) mutated the second TAD. This model has enabled researchers to study p53's suppression of tumour formation

In 2014, Attardi's research unexpectedly linked p53 with a developmental disorder, CHARGE syndrome. While studying mice with a mutated form of p53, researchers noted that mice with one mutated protein and one normal protein developed symptoms similar to CHARGE and died. Researchers also demonstrated a link between p53 and the CHD7 gene, which often displays mutations in cases of CHARGE.

Attardi uses mice with a predisposition to pancreatic cancer as a model of p53 mutation. In 2017 her group reported that mice with a favorable mutation in the TAD2 transcriptional activation domain remained cancer-free longer than mice with the normal p53 gene. Using human cancer genomic data, Attardi has further suggested that a central mechanism of cancer suppression may involve a pathway, or “axis,” of three proteins, with p53 activating Ptpn14, which then suppresses Yap, which would otherwise promote cancer development. Deficiencies in p53 and Ptpn14 might therefore have similar consequences to Yap activation.

== Awards and honors ==
- 2026 Fellow, National Academy of Sciences, Section 41, Hematology, Oncology, and Medical Genetics
- 2024 Fellow, American Association of Cancer Research
- 2015 Outstanding investigator award, National Cancer Institute
- 2008–2013 Research Scholar, Leukemia and Lymphoma Society
- 2007 Fellow, American Association for the Advancement of Science (AAAS)
- 2006–2009 Research Scholar, American Cancer Society
- 2002 Scholar Award, Damon Runyon Cancer Research Foundation
