= Taizō Ishizaka =

Japanese businessman

- 石坂 泰三
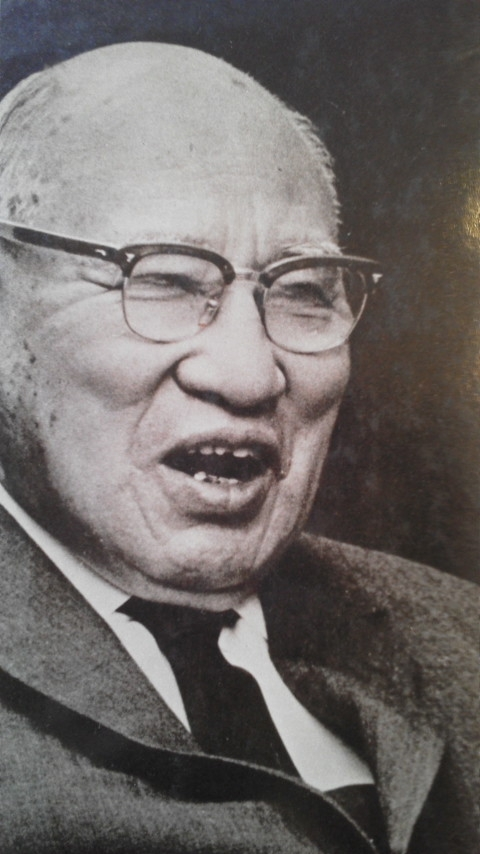

President of the Japanese Federation of Economic Organizations

Personal details
- Born: June 3, 1886
- Died: March 6, 1975
- Education: Faculty of Law, University of Tokyo

Taizō Ishizaka (石坂 泰三, Ishizaka Taizō; June 3, 1886 – March 6, 1975) was a leading Japanese businessman and President of the Japanese Federation of Economic Organizations (now the Japan Business Federation) who served as Chairman of the National Board of the Boy Scouts of Japan.

== Background ==
Ishizaka was born into a middle-class, landed family in 1886. He studied at the First Higher School and the University of Tokyo. Upon graduating in 1911, he took a job at the Ministry of Communications. He later met Tsuneta Yano, the chief executive of Dai-ichi Insurance Company, and started working there in 1915. He became the company's chief executive in 1938.

In 1949, he was asked to become the chief executive of Toshiba, and he saved the company from potential bankruptcy by negotiating with the trade union and laying off 6,000 workers. In 1956, in his role as President of the Japanese Federation of Economic Organizations, he presented a request to the Japanese ruling party for the resignation of Japanese Prime Minister Ichirō Hatoyama.

In 1971, Ishizaka was the 65th awardee of the Bronze Wolf, the only distinction of the World Organization of the Scout Movement, awarded by the World Scout Committee for exceptional services to world Scouting. In 1966 he also received the highest distinction of the Scout Association of Japan, the Golden Pheasant Award.

== See also ==
- Keiichi Ishizaka, music executive who is a close relative of Taizō
