= Kimishige Ishizaka =

Japanese immunologist (1925–2018)

- 石坂 公成
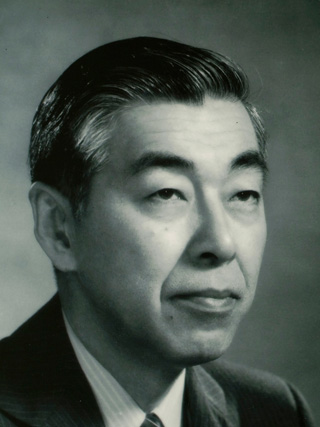
- Ishizaka in 1997
- Born: 3 December 1925; Tokyo, Japan
- Died: 6 July 2018 (aged 92); Yamagata, Japan
- Other name: Kimi Ishizaka
- Citizenship: Japan
- Education: University of Tokyo
- Known for: Discovery of IgE
- Spouse: Teruko Ishizaka
- Awards: Passano Award (1972); Paul Ehrlich and Ludwig Darmstaedter Prize (1973); Gairdner Foundation International Award (1973); Asahi Prize (1973); Japan Academy Prize (1974); Imperial Prize of the Japan Academy (1974); Japan Prize (2000)
- Scientific career
- Fields: Immunology
- Workplaces: University of Colorado Denver; Johns Hopkins University; La Jolla Institute for Allergy and Immunology
- Notable students: Tadamitsu Kishimoto

Kimishige "Kimi" Ishizaka (石坂 公成, Ishizaka Kimishige; 3 December 1925 – 6 July 2018) was a Japanese immunologist who, with his wife Teruko Ishizaka, discovered the antibody class Immunoglobulin E (IgE) in 1966–1967. Their work was regarded as a major breakthrough in the understanding of allergy. He was awarded the 1973 Gairdner Foundation International Award and the 2000 Japan Prize for his work in immunology.

== Early life and education ==
Ishizaka was born in Tokyo to Koki and Kiku Ishizaka. His father was a career soldier who retired in 1933 as a lieutenant general. Ishizaka obtained his medical qualifications and PhD in 1948 from the University of Tokyo. He "was captivated by immunology while taking a summer course in college" and abandoned plans to become a physician.

== Career ==
From 1953 to 1962, he headed the immunoserology division at the department of serology at the Japanese National Institute of Health. During his tenure in that position he spent two years as a research fellow at Caltech (1957–1959).

In 1962, Ishizaka and his wife Teruko were recruited by Sam Bukantz, medical director of the Children's Asthma Research Institute and Hospital (CARIH), and moved to Denver, Colorado. He assumed the post of assistant professor of microbiology at the University of Colorado Medical School, as well as chief of immunology of its associated Children's Asthma Research Institute and CARIH. In 1965, he was promoted to associate professor at University of Colorado Denver.

While at Denver, the Ishizakas discovered the antibody class Immunoglobulin E (IgE) in 1966–1967 and its interplay with mast cells. They demonstrated the IgE's critical role in mediating the release of histamine from mast cells. The discovery of IgE is considered a milestone in immunology and the understanding of allergy.

In 1970, Ishizaka was appointed as O'Neill Professor of Medicine and Microbiology at Johns Hopkins University School of Medicine in Baltimore, Maryland, as well as professor of biology at the Faculty of Arts and Science. From 1982 to 1986, he served as president of the Collegium International Allergologicum. He was elected a foreign associate of the United States National Academy of Sciences in 1983. Ishaka remained at the university until 1989, when he became scientific director, and then president in 1990, of the La Jolla Institute for Allergy and Immunology in La Jolla, California.

After retiring in 1996, he returned to Japan and served as honorary director of the Institute of Immunology at Yamagata University.

== Recognition ==
The Ishizakas received numerous awards for their work in allergy and immunology. In 1972, they received the Passano Foundation Award. In 1973, he received the German Paul Ehrlich and Ludwig Darmstaedter Prize, the Takeda Medical Award, the first Scientific Achievement Award of the International Association of Allergology and together received the Gairdner Foundation International Award. In 1974, he received the Asahi Cultural Award, the Imperial Prize of the Japan Academy, and the Japanese Order of Culture. In 1979, they received the Borden Award. In 2000, he was awarded the 16th Japan Prize.

== Personal life and death ==
Ishizaka was married to Teruko Ishizaka, his partner in many of their discoveries. He died of heart failure at the age of 92 on 6 July 2018 at Yamagata University Hospital in Yamagata, Yamagata.
