= Scott A. Armstrong =

American pediatric oncologist

- Born: Lawton, Oklahoma, US

Academic background
- Education: BSc, chemistry, 1989, University of Oklahoma; MD, PhD, 1994, University of Texas Southwestern Medical Center
- Thesis: Molecular and biochemical characterization of Rab geranylgeranyl transferase (1994)

Academic work
- Institutions: Dana–Farber Cancer Institute; Boston Children's Hospital; Harvard Medical School; Memorial Sloan Kettering Cancer Center; Weill Cornell Medical College
- Website: armstronglab.org

Scott Allen Armstrong is an American pediatric oncologist and cancer biologist focused on chromatin-based control of gene expression in cancer and therapeutic discovery. Armstrong and his team were the first to isolate rare leukemia stem cells in a mouse model of leukemia. Armstrong is a co-editor of the Annual Review of Cancer Biology.

== Early life and education ==
Armstrong was raised in Lawton, Oklahoma and Duncan, Oklahoma and attended Duncan High School. As a student, he was encouraged to apply for the Oklahoma Medical Research Foundation's Sir Alexander Fleming Scholar Program which he described as having a "huge impact on my life."

Following high school, Armstrong majored in chemistry at the University of Oklahoma and completed a dual medical degree/PhD program at the University of Texas Southwestern Medical Center where he studied with Nobel Laureates Michael S. Brown and Joseph L. Goldstein. Following this, Armstrong was the recipient of the 2000 American Society of Hematology Scholar Award Fellowship.

== Career ==
As an instructor in pediatric oncology at the Dana–Farber Cancer Institute, Armstrong's scientific focus was on the genetic abnormalities that are common in childhood leukemias. In 2001, he was the lead investigator on a study researching gene expression patterns to treat cancer. The following year, Armstrong published a landmark study in Nature Genetics which demonstrated that mixed-lineage leukemia (MLLs) exhibited a unique expression signature. A few years later, he also showed how the FMS-like tyrosine kinase-3 was highly expressed and often mutated in MLLs. Armstrong and his team also became the first to isolate rare leukemia stem cells in a mouse model of leukemia.

As a result of his genome-wide technologies to characterize the molecular pathways responsible for leukemia development, Armstrong was elected a member of the American Society for Clinical Investigation and was the recipient of the 2011 Paul Marks Prize for Cancer Research. Later that year, his research team collaborated with a biotechnology company to develop a drug that could deactivate cancer-promoting genes and halt the growth of cancer. The following year, Armstrong was named the incumbent of the Grayer Family Chair at the Memorial Sloan Kettering Cancer Center (MSK). By 2014, Armstrong became the Director of the Leukemia Center at MSK, where he also serves as Vice-Chair for Basic and Translational Research in Pediatrics and as a full member of the MSK Cancer Biology and Genetics Program. As a result of his "exceptional work in leukemia research and cancer stem cell biology," Armstrong was the recipient of the 2014 American Society of Hematology William Dameshek Prize.

Armstrong eventually left MSK in 2016 to become the Chair of the Department of Pediatric Oncology at the Dana–Farber Cancer Institute, and the David G. Nathan Professor of Pediatrics at the Dana–Farber Cancer Institute, Boston Children's Hospital, and Harvard Medical School. He also served as Associate Chief of the Division of Hematology and Oncology at Boston Children's Hospital. While serving in these roles, Armstrong was elected a member of the National Academy of Medicine and awarded the 2019 Tobias Award Lecture from the International Society for Stem Cell Research.
