= Teruko Ishizaka =

Japanese scientist and immunologist (1926–2019)

- Born: Teruko Matsuura; 28 September 1926; Yamagata, Yamagata, Japan
- Died: 4 June 2019 (aged 92); Yamagata, Yamagata, Japan
- Citizenship: Japan
- Education: Tokyo Women's Medical School; University of Tokyo (PhD)
- Known for: Discovery of IgE
- Spouse: Kimishige Ishizaka
- Awards: Passano Award (1972); Gairdner Foundation International Award (1973); Asahi Prize (1973); Borden Award (1979); Behring Kitasato Prize (1990)
- Scientific career
- Fields: Immunology
- Workplaces: California Institute of Technology; Johns Hopkins University

Teruko "Terry" Ishizaka (石坂 照子, Ishizaka Teruko; 28 September 1926 – 4 June 2019) was a Japanese scientist and immunologist who along with her husband Kimishige Ishizaka discovered the antibody class Immunoglobulin E (IgE) in 1966. Their work was regarded as a major breakthrough in the understanding of allergy, and for this work she received the 1972 Passano Award and the 1973 Gairdner Foundation International Award. She was known in the science world for her generosity and collaborative spirit.

== Early life and education ==
Teruko Ishizaka was born into a "prominent family" in Yamagata, Japan on September 28, 1926. Her father was a lawyer and her mother, a homemaker, "encouraged her to pursue a professional career".

She received a doctorate in medicine from Tokyo Women's Medical School in 1949 and a PhD from the University of Tokyo in 1955.

== Career ==
From 1949 until 1957, she and her husband Kimishige Ishizaka worked at Keizo Nakamura's laboratory where she studied the mechanisms of anaphylaxis. In 1957, the couple joined the laboratory of Dan Campbell at the California Institute of Technology to study the immune complex and in 1959 they returned to Japan to continue their work at the Japanese National Institutes of Health.

By 1962, the Ishizakas were recruited to the Children's Asthma Research Institute and Hospital (CARIH, later National Jewish Health) in Denver. In 1966, they announced their discovery of the IgE antibody class. At about the same time, S.G.O Johansson and Hans Bennich made the same discovery in Uppsala, Sweden. In April 1969, they published a joint paper .

By 1970, rumors of a merger with the National Jewish Hospital made the couple move to the Allergy and Immunology Center at Johns Hopkins University in Baltimore .

In 1989, she published research demonstrating that a human mast cell also developed from haemopoietic stem cell, something that had been demonstrated before only in mice. The same year, her husband became the first Scientific Director of the La Jolla Institute for Immunology, so she moved to California, and retired in 1993.

For their achievements the couple were awarded the Passano Foundation Award in 1972 and the Gairdner Foundation International Award in 1973 and the Borden Award in 1979. Ishizaka was the first female scientist in Japan to receive the Behring Kitasato Prize.

== Personal life ==
In 1949, Teruko Ishizaka married fellow scientist Kimishige Ishizaka. They had one son, Yutaka Ishizaka. In 1996, after her husband had retired, they returned to her native Yamagata, Yamagata in Japan. On June 4, 2019, Ishizaka died with symptoms of Parkinson's disease in Yamagata, Japan, at the age of 92 years. Her husband had preceded her in death also at the age of 92 one year prior, on 6 July 2018.

== See also ==
- Timeline of women in science
