= Keiichi Ishizaka =

- Born: August 25, 1945; Saitama-ken
- Died: December 31, 2016 (aged 71)
- Education: Keio University
- Employer(s): Toshiba-EMI (1968–1993); Universal Music Japan (1994–2009); Warner Music Japan (2011–2014)
- Relatives: Taizō Ishizaka
- Awards: 2009 Medal of Honor for Public Service Awardee; 2015 Order of the Rising Sun, Gold Rays with Neck Ribbon Awardee

Keiichi Ishizaka (石坂 敬一, Ishizaka Keiichi; August 25, 1945 – December 31, 2016) was a Japanese music industry executive who was the chairman of Recording Industry Association of Japan.

== Personal life ==
Born in Saitama-ken, he learned the music of Japan while studying Business Administration at Keio University. He graduated in 1968 in the same school.

=== EMI days ===
Ishizaka became an inside director in 1968 before being promoted at Toshiba-EMI in 1991 and stayed until 1993. He was called "Mr. Beatles" for endless efforts of promoting the British band's albums in Japan.

=== PolyGram/Universal days ===
In 1998, Ishizaka became the executive director of Universal Music Japan. Three years later, he became the company's CEO, and in October 2006 he became the chairman until November 2009, when he retired. He was replaced as UMG Japan's CEO the same month by former A&R VP and Def Jam Japan GM Koike Kazuhiko.

=== RIAJ chairmanship ===
Ishizaka was the RIAJ's chairman from July 2007, until he was replaced by Sony Music Japan CEO Naoki Kitagawa in the RIAJ presidency in June 2011.

=== Warner days ===
In November 2011, Keiichi Ishizaka became the CEO and chairman of Warner Music Japan, replacing Hirokazu Tanaka who served as the acting head of the company since the October 2010 death of Takashi Yoshida. After three years, he resigned on April 1, 2014.

== Awards ==
In November 2009, Ishizaka was awarded with a Medal of Honour with blue ribbon by the Government of Japan. He was later awarded the Order of the Rising Sun on November 3, 2015.
