= La Jolla Institute for Immunology =

Research institute near San Diego, California, U.S.

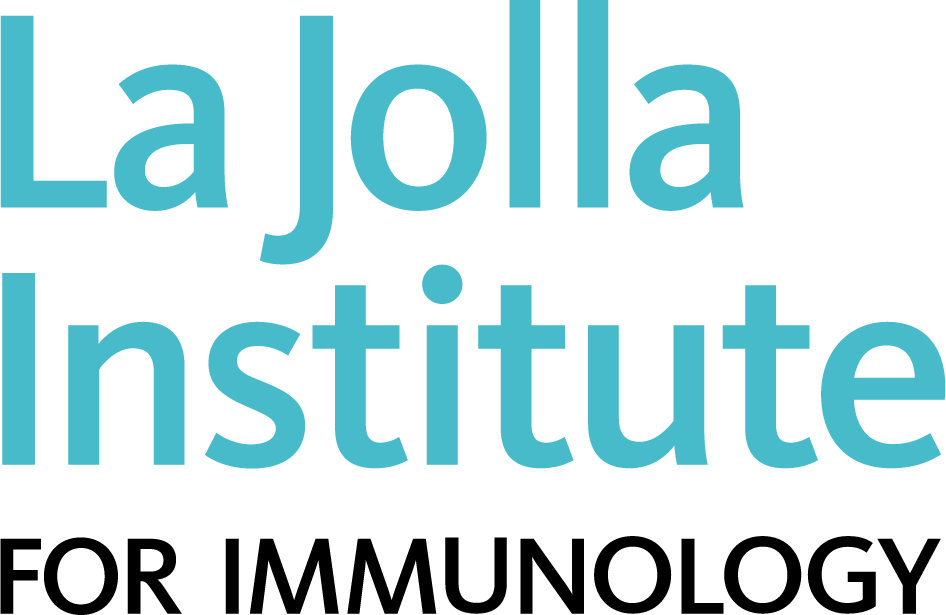
- Motto: Life Without Disease
- Founder: Makoto Nonaka
- Established: 1988
- Focus: Immunology Research
- President: Erica Ollmann Saphire, Ph.D.
- Faculty: 21
- Owner: Non-profit, independent research institute
- Slogan: Life Without Disease
- Formerly called: La Jolla Institute for Allergy and Immunology
- Address: 9420 Athena Circle
- Location: La Jolla, San Diego, California, United States
- Coordinates: 32.87721°N 117.21993°W
- Interactive map of La Jolla Institute for Immunology
- Website: lji.org

La Jolla Institute for Immunology (LJI) is a non-profit research organization in La Jolla, a community of San Diego, California. The institute was founded in 1988. It is located in UC San Diego’s Research Park. Scientists at the institute study the fundamental workings of immune cells and the immune system's role in cancer, infectious diseases, autoimmune diseases, neurodegenerative diseases, and other conditions.

The institute employs over 150 M.D.s and Ph.D.s, including 21 faculty members and around 400 employees. Dr. Erica Ollmann Saphire has served as LJI's president and CEO since 2021.

La Jolla Institute for Immunology is a collaborative research organization that has forged many partnerships within the research community in San Diego, across the United States, and abroad. The institute's biomedical research facility covers 145,000 square feet inclusive of specialized research rooms suited for all aspects of molecular and cellular biology.

== History ==
La Jolla Institute for Immunology was established in 1988 by a coalition that included Makoto Nonaka, the institute's founding president, and Kimishige Ishizaka, the institute's first scientific director.

In 1989 the institute began its laboratory operations with the arrival of two immunologists, Kimishige Ishizaka and Teruko Ishizaka, from Johns Hopkins University in Baltimore, Maryland. The Ishizakas were co-discoverers in 1966 of the IgE (immunoglobulin E) protein, a molecule that induces allergic reactions in the human body. In 1991, Kimishige Ishizaka was appointed president and scientific director of the institute and served in the role until his retirement in 1995.

In 1995, Howard Grey joined La Jolla Institute of Immunology as president and scientific director. During the next several years, the institute recruited prominent faculty members and formulated a program to accelerate the commercial development of LJI's research and drug discoveries. In 1996, the institute moved from its initial location on Torrey Pines Road in La Jolla to a new purpose-built facility on Science Center Drive on the Torrey Pines Mesa.

In 2003, Mitchell Kronenberg was appointed president and scientific director. That same year, the Immune Epitope Database (IEDB) was established and launched. The database was designed and developed by La Jolla Institute under a competitive contract from the National Institute of Allergy and Infectious Diseases (NIAID), part of the NIH. In 2012, the NIH renewed their contract with the institute for a further seven years.

In 2006 the institute opened a new research facility located in the new UC San Diego Science Research Park.

In 2013, La Jolla Institute extended its partnership with the Japanese pharmaceutical company Kyowa Hakko Kirin. The six-year agreement continues a research alliance that began in 1988. In 2015, La Jolla Institute for Immunology announced its affiliation with the UC San Diego Health System.

La Jolla Institute for Immunology in 2019

In 2018, La Jolla Institute for Allergy and Immunology changed its name to La Jolla Institute for Immunology to reflect its current focus.

In 2019, LJI expanded its molecular imaging facility to house a Titan Krios cryo-electron microscope, which is used for 3D imaging of structures such as viral proteins and human antibodies.

In 2020, scientists at the institute formed a Coronavirus Task Force in response to the COVID-19 pandemic. At the same time, the institute became the home of the Coronavirus Immunotherapy Consortium (CoVIC), a research collaboration to test antibodies against the novel coronavirus, SARS-CoV-2, led by structural virologist Erica Ollmann Saphire.

In 2021, Dr. Mitchell Kronenberg stepped down from his role as president, and Dr. Saphire was named institute president and CEO. That same year, LJI opened the John and Susan Major Center for Clinical Investigation, where staff members interact with clinical study volunteers.

In 2025, La Jolla Institute extended its partnership with the Japanese pharmaceutical company Kyowa Kirin, Inc. The three-year agreement continues a research alliance that began in 1988.

== Scientific activities ==
Scientists at La Jolla Institute for Immunology study the fundamental workings of the immune system. This includes studying the cells driving allergies and autoimmune diseases, as well as the cells that aim to fight cancers and infectious diseases. The institute is made up of four centers: the Center for Autoimmunity and Inflammation, the Center for Cancer Immunotherapy, the Center for Vaccine Innovation, and the Center for Sex-based Differences in the Immune System.

Scientists at LJI also lead research into genomic sequencing of immune cells and high-resolution imaging of virus/antibody interactions through cryo-electron microscopy. The institute is home to the Immune Epitope Database (IEDB) and the DICE (Database of Immune Cell Expression, Expression of quantitative trait loci and Epigenomics).

Scientists at LJI, in collaboration with researchers at the J. Craig Venter Institute, were the first to publish an analysis of potential SARS-CoV-2 epitopes vulnerable to the human immune system. Since then, COVID-19 research at LJI has shed light on how both CD+8 and CD+4 T cells respond to the SARS-CoV-2 virus. These findings can inform vaccine efforts. Scientists at the institute have analyzed mutations in the SARS-CoV-2 virus. Additional COVID-19 projects at the institute include research to understand how the virus affects white blood cells called monocytes and research into multisystem inflammatory syndrome in children (MIS-C).

Researchers at LJI have established several international research partnerships, including research collaborations in Nepal to study flavivirus infection, collaborations in Sierra Leone to study hemorrhagic fever viruses., and a collaborative program in Italy to exchange trainees and advance biomedical research programs at Link Campus University in Rome.

== Recognition ==
Scientists at La Jolla Institute for Immunology have been recognized on Clarivate's annual "Highly Cited Researchers" list. Seven LJI researchers were among the top cited researchers in 2025. Twelve LJI researchers were named to the list in 2024, seven in 2023, six in 2021, four in 2019, and two in 2018, among other years.
