= Ciechanover =

Ciechanover is a surname. Notable people with the surname include:

- Aaron Ciechanover (born 1947), Israeli biologist and Nobel laureate
- Joseph Ciechanover (1933–2024), Israeli diplomat
