= Tyler Jacks =

American scientist & professor

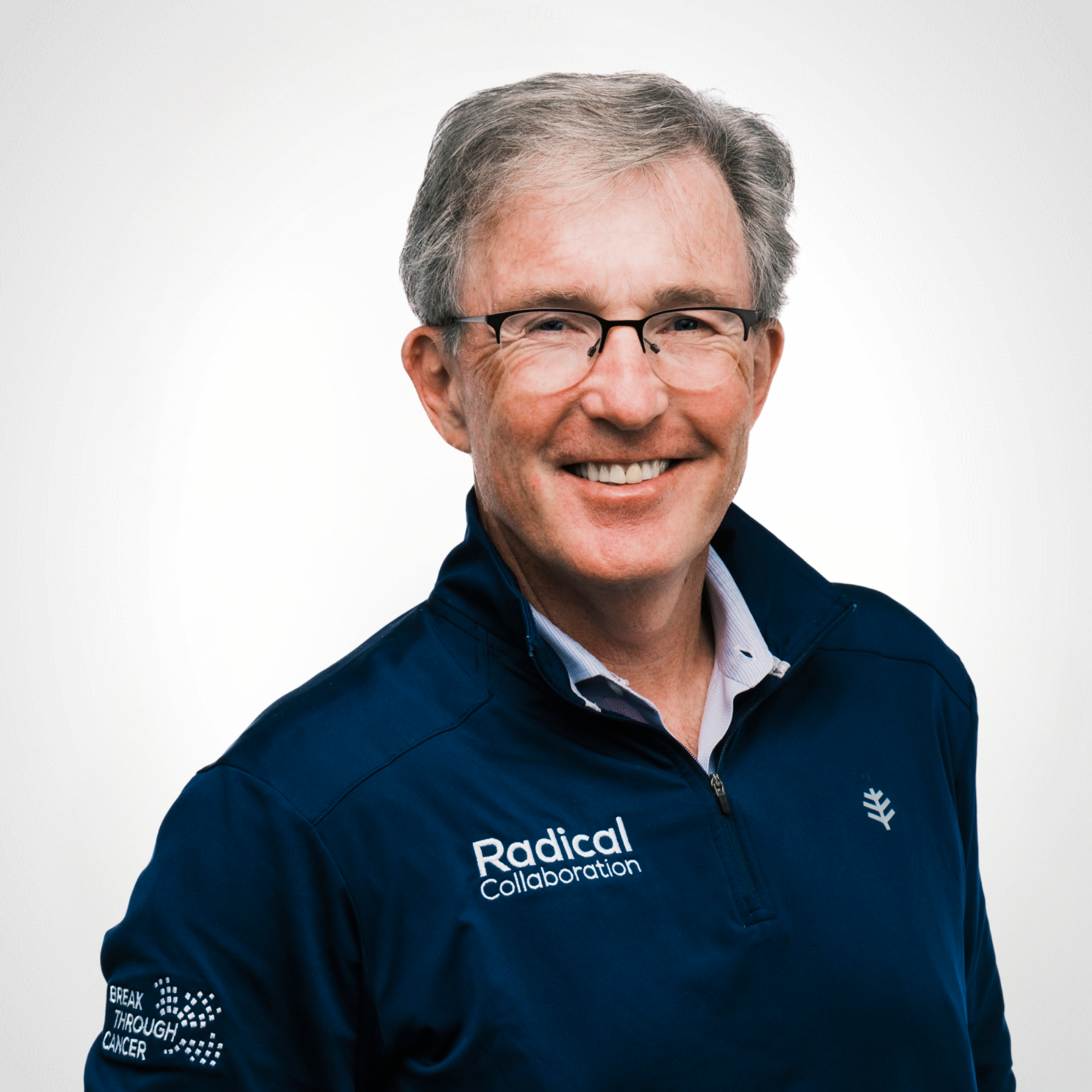
- Tyler Jacks
- Education: Harvard University; University of California, San Francisco
- Known for: Genetically engineered mouse models (GEMMs) of human cancer; tumor-immune interactions; promoting inter-disciplinary and inter-institutional collaboration in cancer research
- Scientific career
- Fields: Cancer Biology; Cancer Genetics; Tumor Immunology
- Workplaces: David H. Koch Institute for Integrative Cancer Research; Massachusetts Institute of Technology; Break Through Cancer
- Doctoral advisor: Harold E. Varmus
- Other academic advisors: Robert Weinberg

Tyler Jacks is an American cancer biologist and the David H. Koch Professor of Biology at the Massachusetts Institute of Technology (MIT). He is the founding director of MIT's David H. Koch Institute for Integrative Cancer Research and its successor, the Koch Institute, from 2001 to 2021. Jacks was a Howard Hughes Medical Institute investigator from 1994 to 2021, when he became president of Break Through Cancer. His research is best known for the development and analysis of genetically engineered mouse models (GEMMS), a foundational contribution to modern cancer biology that has helped shape how scientists study tumor initiation, progression, and the treatment response across every major cancer type.

== Early life ==
Tyler Jacks graduated from Algonquin Region High School (Northborough, MA) in 1979. He received his AB from Harvard University in 1983(magna cum laude with highest honors in biology). Jacks earned a PhD in biochemistry from the University of California, San Francisco, in 1988 under the guidance of Nobel Laureate Harold Varmus. He then went on to perform postdoctoral research at MIT in the Whitehead Institute in the laboratory of Robert Weinberg.

== Career ==
Jacks joined the MIT faculty as assistant professor in 1992, was promoted to associate professor with tenure in 1997, and full professor in 2000. He served as director of the MIT Center for Cancer Research and its successor, the Koch Institute for Integrative Cancer Research, from 2001 to 2021. The Koch Institute brought together cancer scientists and cancer-oriented engineers into a highly collaborative, multidisciplinary environment. Jacks was a Howard Hughes Medical Institute investigator from 1994 to 2021.

In 2021, Jacks became president of Break Through Cancer, a cancer research foundation created to support collaborative, multi-institutional research teams focused on difficult-to-treat cancers. The organization brings together researchers from five leading cancer institutions — Dana-Farber Cancer Institute, Johns Hopkins Sidney Kimmel Comprehensive Cancer Center, Memorial Sloan Kettering Cancer Center, The University of Texas MD Anderson Cancer Center, and the Koch Institute for Integrative Cancer Research at MIT — using a model centered on shared data, shared materials, coordinated project management, and research designed to move discoveries into clinical settings more quickly. Break Through Cancer describes its approach as “radical collaboration,” emphasizing coordination across institutions, disciplines, clinical strategy, and translational research.

He taught introductory biology (7.013) at MIT for many years and currently teaches The Hallmarks of Cancer (7.45). He served on the board of scientific advisors of the National Cancer Institute and chaired the National Cancer Advisory Board. He is a past president of the American Association for Cancer Research (2009). He was a founding co-editor of the Annual Review of Cancer Biology in 2017, serving until 2021.

Jacks is a member of the board of directors of Amgen and Thermo Fisher Scientific. and Aveo Pharmaceuticals Inc. He co-founded Dragonfly Therapeutics in 2015 and serves as chair of its scientific advisory board; he co-founded T2Biosystems in 2006 and Novello Therapeutics in 2026. He serves on the scientific advisory board of Skyhawk Therapeutics. He served previously on the scientific advisory boards of SQZ Biotech (until 2023) and Aveo Pharmaceuticals.

Jacks served on the Harvard University Board of Overseers from 2019 to 2025, including as vice chair of the board’s executive committee for the 2024–25 academic year. He is also a member of the scientific advisory board of The Francis Crick Institute (London).

== Research ==
Jacks' most significant scientific contribution is the development of a series of genetically engineered mouse models (GEMMS) of human cancer. These models — which carry targeted mutations in genes such as p53, Rb, Nf1, and K-ras — were among the first to closely recapitulate how human tumors initiate and progress, and are now foundational tools used across the field of cancer biology. His laboratory has used GEMMs to study tumor suppressor genes, oncogenes, DNA repair pathways, tumor evolution, treatment response, and mechanisms of drug resistance. Mouse models of more than nine cancer types have been produced, including lung, pancreatic, ovarian, colorectal, brain, and soft-tissue cancers.

In more recent years, the lab has moved into the area of tumor immunology, using mouse models to understand how the immune system recognizes and responds to, and how tumors evade, immune surveillance. The lab has also adopted organoid systems to accelerate model development in tissue culture and upon orthotopic transplantation.

== Awards and recognitions ==
- 1997: AACR Rhoads Award for outstanding Achievement in Cancer Research.
- 1998: Amgen Award from the American Society for Biochemistry and Molecular Biology.
- 1997: Daniel K. Ludwig Scholar in Cancer Research.
- 2002: Chestnut Hill Award for Excellence in Medical Research.
- 2005: Paul Marks Prize for Cancer Research.
- 2009: Elected to the National Academy of Science.
- 2009: Elected to the National Academy of Medicine.
- 2012: Elected to the American Academy of Arts and Sciences.
- 2013: Elected Fellow of the AACR Academy (inaugural class).
- 2015: Sergio Lombroso Award in Cancer Research.
- 2015: MIT James R. Killian Jr. Faculty Achievement Award—the highest honor the MIT faculty can bestow on one of its members.
- 2020: AACR Princess Takamatsu Memorial Lectureship.
- 2025: American-Italian Cancer Foundation Award for Excellence in Medicine.
- 2026: American Cancer Society Medal of Honor—the organization’s highest scientific recognition, awarded for his pioneering work on genetically engineered mouse models of human cancer.

== Selected Publications ==
- Jacks T, Fazeli A, Schmitt EM, Bronson RT, Goodell MA, Weinberg RA. 1992. Effects of an Rb mutation in the mouse. Nature 359(6393): 295-300.
- Lowe SW, Schmitt EM, Smith SW, Osborne BA, Jacks T. 1993. p53 is required for radiation-induced apoptosis in mouse thymocytes. Nature 362(6423): 847-9.
- Jacks T, Remington L, Williams BO, Schmitt EM, Halachmi S, Bronson RT, Weinberg RA. 1994. Tumor spectrum analysis in p53-mutant mice. Curr Biol 4(1): 1-7.
- Jacks T, Shih TS, Schmitt EM, Bronson RT, Bernards A, Weinberg RA. 1994. Tumour predisposition in mice heterozygous for a targeted mutation in Nf1. Nat Genet 7(3): 353-61.
- Brugarolas J, Chandrasekaran C, Gordon JI, Beach D, Jacks T, Hannon G. 1995. Radiation-induced cell cycle arrest compromised by p21 deficiency. Nature 377(6549): 552-7.
- McClatchey AI, Saotome I, Mercer K, Crowley D, Gusella JF, Bronson RT, Jacks T. 1998. Mice heterozygous for a mutation at the Nf2 tumor suppressor locus develop a range of highly metastic tumors. Genes Dev 12(8): 1121-33.
- Cichowski K, Shih TS, Schmitt E, Santiago S, Reilly K, McLaughlin ME, Bronson RT, Jacks T. 1999. Mouse models of tumor development in neurofibromatosis type 1. Science 286(5447): 2172-6.
- Tuveson DA, Shaw AT, Willis NA, Silver DP, Jackson EL, Chang S, Mercer KL, Grochow R, Hock H, Crowley D, Hingorani SR, Zaks T, King C, Jacobetz MA, Wang L, Bronson RT, Orkin SH, DePinho RA, Jacks T. 2004. Endogenous oncogenic K-ras(G12D) stimulates proliferation and widespread neoplastic and developmental defects. Cancer Cell 5(4):375-87.
- Olive KP, Tuveson DA, Ruhe ZC, et al. and Jacks T. 2004. Mutant p53 Gain-of-Function in Two Mouse Models of Li-Fraumeni Syndrome. Cell, 119(6):847-860.
- Kim CF, Jackson EL, Woolfenden AE, et al. and Jacks T. 2005. Identification of bronchioalveolar stem cells in normal lung and lung cancer. Cell, 121(6):823-835
- Sweet-Cordero A, Mukherjee S, Subramanian A, You H, Roix JJ, Ladd-Acosta C, Mesirov J, Golub TR, Jacks T. 2005. An oncogenic KRAS2 expression signature identified by cross-species gene expression analysis. Nat Genet (37)1: 48-55.
- Ventura A, Kirsch DG, McLaughlin ME, et al. and Jacks T. 2007. Restoration of p53 function leads to tumor regression in vivo. Nature, 445, 661-665.
- Gidekel Friedlander SY, Chu GC, Snyder EL, Girnius N, Dibelius G, Crowley D, Vasile E, DePinho RA, Jacks T. 2009. Context-dependent transformation of adult pancreatic cells by oncogenic K-ras. Cancer Cell 16(5): 379-89.
- Meylan E, Dooley AL, Feldser DM, Shen L, Turk E, Ouang C, Jacks T. 2009. Requirement for NF-kB signalling in a mouse model of lung adenocarcinoma. Nature 462(7269): 104-7.
- Feldser DM, Kostova KK, Winslow MM, Taylor SE, Cashman C, Whittaker CA, Sanchez-Rivera FJ, Resnick R, Bronson R, Hemann MT, Jacks T. 2010. Stage-specific sensitivity to p53 restoration during lung cancer progression. Nature 468 (7323): 572-5
- DuPage M, Cheung AF, Mazumdar C, Winslow MM, Bronson R, Schmidt LM, Crowley D, Chen J, Jacks T. 2011. Endogenous T cell responses to antigens expressed in lung adenocarcinomas delay malignant tumor progression. Cancer Cell 19(1): 72-85.
- Winslow MM, Dayton TL, Verhaak RG, Kim-Kiselak C, Snyder EL, Feldser DM, Hubbard DD, DuPage M, Whittaker CA, Hoersch S, Yoon S, Crowley D, Bronson RT, Chiang DY, Meyerson M, Jacks T. 2011. Suppression of lung adenocarcinoma progression by Nkx2-1. Nature 473(7345): 101-4.
- DuPage M, Mazumdar C, Scmidt LM, Cheung AF, Jacks T. 2012. Expression of tumour-specific antigens underlies cancer immunoediting. Nature 482 (7385): 405-9.
- Sánchez-Rivera FJ, Papagiannakopoulos T, Romero R, Tammela T, Bauer MR, Bhutkar A, Joshi NS, Subbaraj L, Bronson RT, Xue W, Jacks T. 2014. Rapid modelling of cooperating genetic events in cancer through somatic genome editing. Nature 516 (7531): 428-31.
- Tammela T, Sánchez-Rivera F, Cetinbas NM, Wu K, Joshi NS, Helenius K, Park Y, Azimi R, Kerper NR, Wesselhoeft RA, Gu X, Schmidt L, Cornwall-Brady M, Yilmaz ÖH, Xue W, Katajisto P, Bhutkar A, Jacks T. 2017. A Wnt-producing niche drives proliferative potential and progression in lung adenocarcinoma. Nature 545(7654):355-359.
- Jin C, Lagoudas GK, Zhao C, Bullman S, Bhutkar A, Hu B, Ameh S, Sandel D, Liang XS, Mazzilli S, Whary MT, Meyerson M, Germain R, Blainey PC, Fox JG, Jacks T. 2019. Commensal Microbiota Promote Lung Cancer Development via gd T Cells. Cell 176(5):998-1013.
- LaFave LM, Kartha VK, Ma S, Meli K, Del Priore I, Lareau C, Naranjo S, Westcott PMK, Duarte FM, Sankar V, Chiang Z, Brack A, Law T, Hauck H, Okimoto A, Regev A, Buenrostro JD, Jacks T. 2020. Epigenomic State Transitions Characterize Tumor Progression in Mouse Lung Adenocarcinoma. Cancer Cell. 38(2):212-228.
- Burger ML, Cruz AM, Crossland GE, Gaglia G, Ritch CC, Blatt SE, Bhutkar A, Canner D, Kienka T, Tavana SZ, Barandiaran AL, Garmilla A, Schenkel JM, Hillman M, de Los Rios Kobara I, Li A, Jaeger AM, Hwang WL, Westcott PMK, Manos MP, Holovatska MM, Hodi FS, Regev A, Santagata S, Jacks T. 2021. Antigen dominance hierarchies shape TCF1 ^{+} progenitor CD8 T cell phenotypes in tumors. Cell 184(19):4996-5014.
- Freed-Pastor WA, Lambert LJ, Ely ZA, Pattada NB, Bhutkar A, Eng G, Mercer KL, Garcia AP, Lin L, Rideout WM 3rd, Hwang WL, Schenkel JM, Jaeger AM, Bronson RT, Westcott PMK, Hether TD, Divakar P, Reeves JW, Deshpande V, Delorey T, Phillips D, Yilmaz OH, Regev A, Jacks T. 2021. The CD155/TIGIT axis promotes and maintains immune evasion in neoantigen-expressing pancreatic cancer. Cancer Cell 39(10):1342-1360.e14.
- Yang D, Jones MG, Naranjo S, Rideout WM 3rd, Min KHJ, Ho R, Wu W, Replogle JM, Page JL, Quinn JJ, Horns F, Qiu X, Chen MZ, Freed-Pastor WA, McGinnis CS, Patterson DM, Gartner ZJ, Chow ED, Bivona TG, Chan MM, Yosef N, Jacks T, Weissman JS. 2022. Lineage tracing reveals the phylodynamics, plasticity, and paths of tumor evolution. Cell. May 26;185(11):1905-1923.e25.
- Jaeger AM, Stopfer LE, Ahn R, Sanders EA, Sandel DA, Freed-Pastor WA, Rideout WM 3rd, Naranjo S, Fessenden T, Nguyen KB, Winter PS, Kohn RE, Westcott PMK, Schenkel JM, Shanahan SL, Shalek AK, Spranger S, White FM, Jacks T. 2022. Deciphering the immunopeptidome in vivo reveals new tumour antigens. Nature. Jul;607(7917):149-155.
- Ely ZA, Mathey-Andrews N, Naranjo S, Gould SI, Mercer KL, Newby GA, Cabana CM, Rideout WM 3rd, Jaramillo GC, Khirallah JM, Holland K, Randolph PB, Freed-Pastor WA, Davis JR, Kulstad Z, Westcott PMK, Lin L, Anzalone AV, Horton BL, Pattada NB, Shanahan SL, Ye Z, Spranger S, Xu Q, Sánchez-Rivera FJ, Liu DR, Jacks T. 2023. A prime editor mouse to model a broad spectrum of somatic mutations in vivo. Nat Biotechnol. May 11. doi: 10.1038/s41587-023-01783-y.
- Westcott PMK, Muyas F, Hauck H, Smith O, Sacks N, Ely Z, Jaeger A, Rideout III W, Zhang D, Bhutkar A, Beytagh M, Canner D, Jaramillo G, Bronson R, Naranjo S, Jin A, Patten JJ, Cruz A, Shanahan SL, Cortes-Ciriano I, Jacks, T. 2023. Mismatch repair deficiency is not sufficient to elicit tumor immunogenicity. Nat Genetics Sept 14; doi: 10.1038/s41588-023-01499-4.
- Ely ZA, Kulstad ZJ, Gunaydin G, Addepalli S, Verzani EK, Casarrubios M, Clauser KR, Wang X, Lippincott IE, Louvet C, Schmitt T, Kapner KS, Agus MP, Hennessey CJ, Cleary JM, Hadrup SR, Klaeger S, Su J, Jaeger AM, Wolpin BM, Raghavan S, Smith EL, Greenberg PD, Aguirre AJ, Abelin JG, Carr SA, Jacks T, Freed-Pastor WA. 2025. Pancreatic cancer-restricted cryptic antigens are targets for T cell recognition. Science. May 8;388(6747):eadk3487. doi: 10.1126/science.adk3487. Epub 2025 May 8.
