= VP40 =

Virus matrix protein

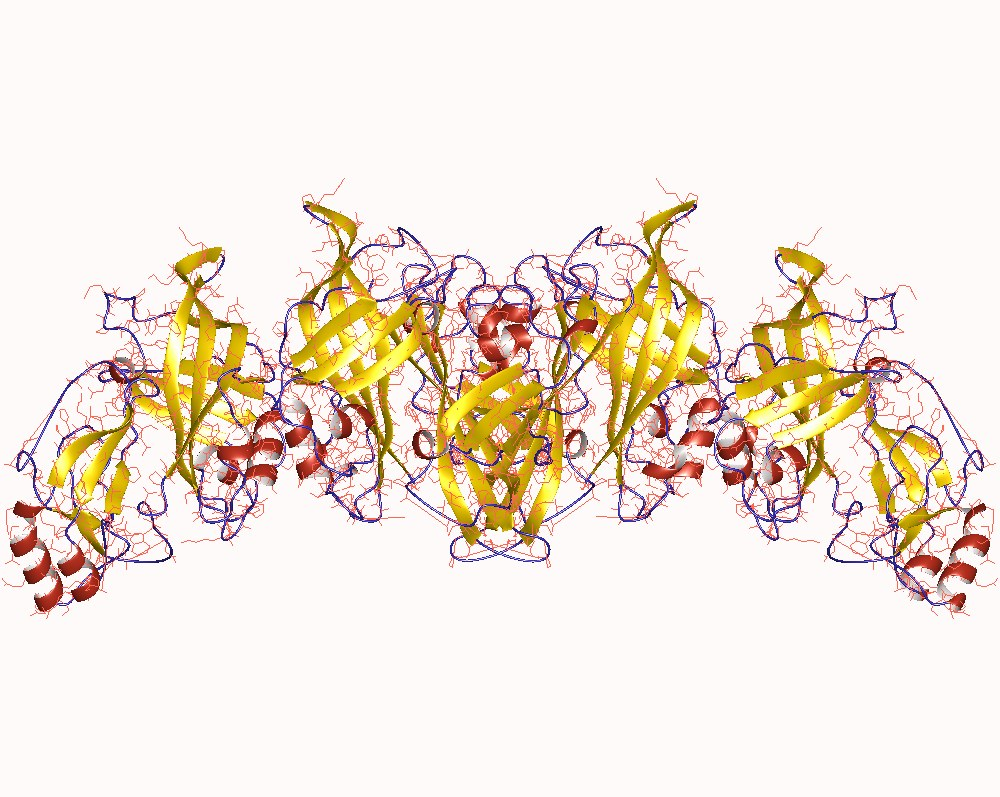
- VP40 matrix protein hexamer, Ebola virus

Identifiers
- Symbol: VP40
- Pfam: PF07447
- InterPro: IPR008986
- SCOP2: 1h2c / SCOPe / SUPFAM
Available protein structures:
- PDB: IPR008986 PF07447 (ECOD; PDBsum)
- AlphaFold: IPR008986; PF07447

In molecular biology, VP40 is the name of a viral matrix protein. Most commonly, it is found in the Ebola virus (EBOV), a type of non-segmented, negative-strand RNA virus. Ebola virus causes a severe and often fatal haemorrhagic fever in humans, known as Ebola virus disease. The virus matrix protein VP40 is a major structural protein that plays a central role in virus assembly and budding at the plasma membrane of infected cells.

== Structure ==
The VP40 monomer consists of two protein domains, the N-terminal oligomerization domain and the C-terminal membrane-binding domain, connected by a flexible linker. Both the N- and C-terminal domains fold into beta sandwich structures of similar topology. Within the N-terminal domain are two overlapping L-domains with the sequences PTAP and PPEY at residues 7 to 13, which are required for efficient budding. L-domains are thought to mediate their function in budding through their interaction with specific host cellular proteins, such as TSG101 and vps-4.

== Function ==
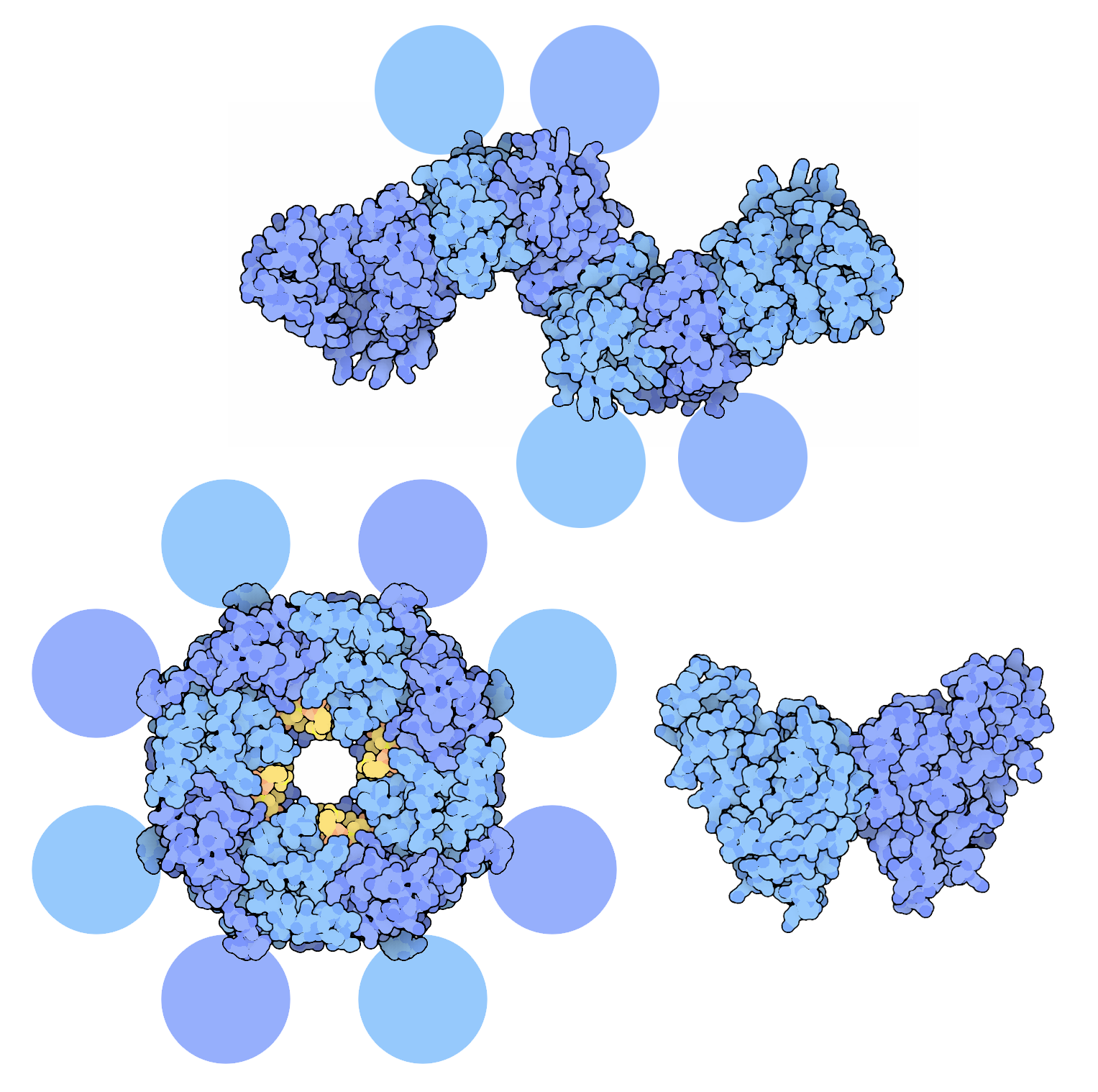
Different structures VP40 assumes in its functional roles

VP40 coordinates numerous functions in the viral life cycle of the Ebola virus. These include: regulation of viral transcription, morphogenesis, packaging and budding of mature virions.

VP40 goes through intermediate states of assembly (e.g. octamers). It has been noted that proteins encoded by EBOV (VP30, VP35, and VP40) act independently as suppressors of RNA silencing, indicating that the virus actively resists cellular RNAi during replication.

== Significance of VP40 ==
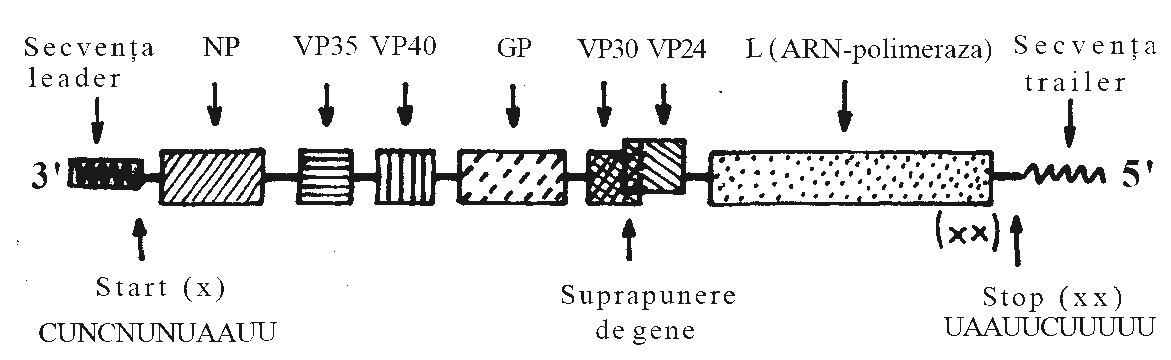
VP40 position in the Ebola virus genome

Study of the matrix protein VP40 is important due to the high mortality rate of the Ebola virus, which is listed as a WHO Risk Group 4 Pathogen, an HHS Select Agent, an NIH/NIAID Category A Priority Pathogen, a CDC Category A Bioterrorism Agent, and a Biological Agent for Export Control by the Australia Group.

Expression of the matrix protein VP40 is sufficient to generate virus-like particles (no viral genetic material) in a mammalian host that are remarkably indistinguishable from live virus, from a morphological standpoint.

=== West African Ebola virus outbreak ===
During and after the 2014-2016 West African Ebola virus epidemic treatment options were sought; among them were the VP40 matrix protein as a target for possible research that may (or may not) lead to a therapeutic option.
