= Giuseppe Attardi =

American geneticist

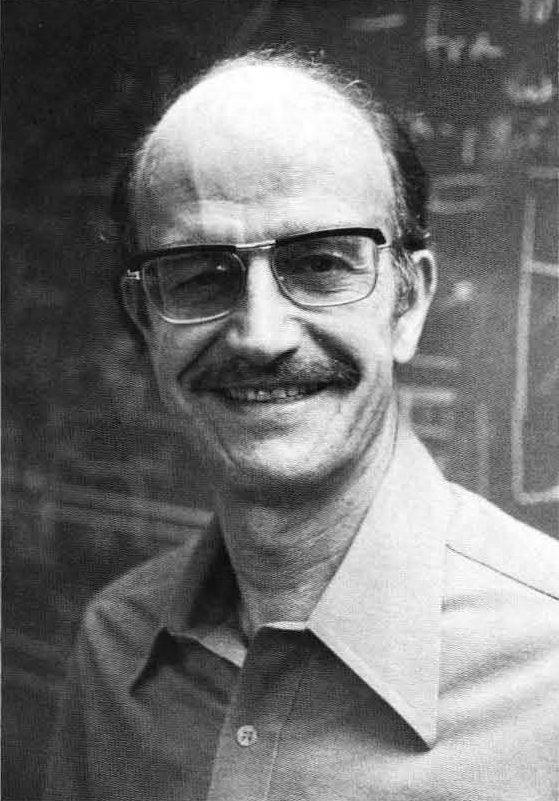
- Giuseppe Attardi in 1986
- Born: September 14, 1923; Vicari, Italy
- Died: April 5, 2008 (aged 84); Altadena, California
- Education: University of Padua
- Known for: Pioneering human mitochondrial genetics
- Children: Laura Attardi
- Awards: Gairdner Foundation International Award, Passano Award, Feltrinelli Prize (1989)
- Scientific career
- Fields: Molecular biology
- Workplaces: California Institute of Technology

Giuseppe Attardi (September 14, 1923 – April 5, 2008) was an American molecular biologist of Italian origin, a professor at the California Institute of Technology in Pasadena. He made pioneering studies on the human mitochondrial structure and function.

Attardi was awarded two Guggenheim Fellowships, in 1970 and 1986, for his work in molecular and cellular biology. He received the Gairdner Foundation International Award in 1998 for his contributions to medical science and was selected jointly with Douglas C. Wallace for the 2000 Passano Award "for their landmark contributions to the mitochondrial genome project and their development of innovative methods for studying mitochondrial genetics and human disease".

He was a member of the United States National Academy of Sciences from 1984.
