= United Kingdom aid efforts for the 2014 Ebola epidemic in West Africa =

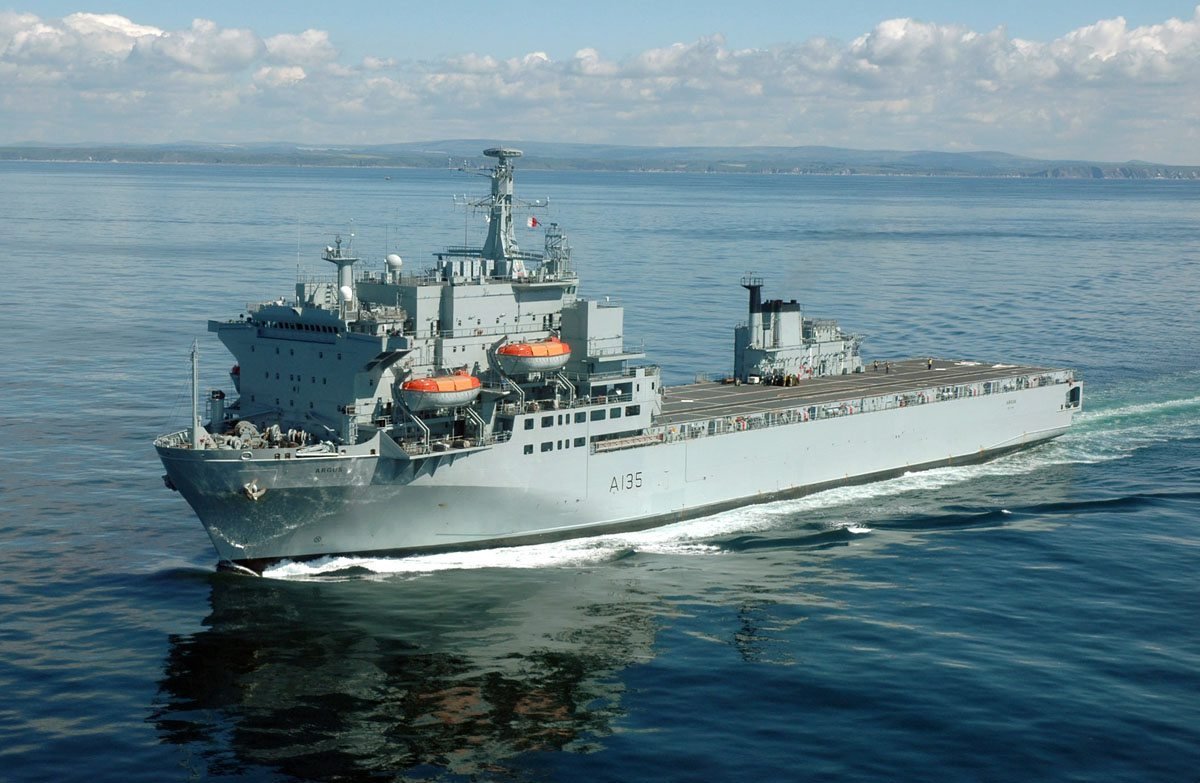
The Royal Navy's Argus

In late October 2014, the United Kingdom sent a hospital ship, the Royal Fleet Auxiliary's Argus, to help the aid effort against the Ebola virus disease epidemic in Sierra Leone. By late October Sierra Leone was experiencing more than twenty deaths a day from Ebola.

The aid supplies delivered included 20 vehicles including ambulances; 75 water tanks; 3 incinerators for disposing of clothing and other materials; 12 generators; personal protection equipment; radio equipment; lighting sets; chlorine for sanitation; latrine slabs; temporary warehouse tents; 14 air conditioning units and isolator equipment.

More than 160 National Health Service (NHS) staff volunteered to travel to west Africa and help those affected by Ebola. On 22 November over 30 NHS volunteers flew over to Freetown, Sierra Leone to assist with the Ebola epidemic.

== Kerry Town treatment centre ==
The Kerry Town (Sierra Leone) treatment centre was the first of six Ebola treatment centres funded by the Department for International Development. The centre is run by Save the Children, and opened on 5 November 2014. The centre provides treatment beds for 80 general patients, and 12 health care workers, with plans for an additional 8 health care beds.

== See also ==
- Ebola virus epidemic in West Africa
- Responses to the Ebola virus epidemic in West Africa
- Ebola virus disease in the United Kingdom
