= Pauline Cafferkey =

British nurse and Ebola survivor

Pauline Cafferkey is a Scottish nurse and aid worker who contracted Ebola virus disease in 2014 while working in Sierra Leone as part of the medical aid effort during the West African Ebola virus epidemic. She survived the illness.

== Initial admission to hospital ==
On 29 December 2014, Cafferkey, who had just returned to Glasgow from Sierra Leone via Casablanca Airport and London Heathrow Airport, was diagnosed with Ebola virus disease at Glasgow's Gartnavel General Hospital. She had been working at an Ebola treatment centre in Kerry Town in Sierra Leone, and it is thought she contracted the virus as a result of wearing a visor, as recommended by the World Health Organization and the UK Ministry of Defence, instead of goggles.

After initial treatment in Glasgow, she was transferred by air to RAF Northolt, then to the specialist high-level isolation unit at the Royal Free Hospital in London for longer-term treatment. A Scottish government spokesman described the risk to the general public as "extremely low to the point of negligible" due to the very early stage of the infection at the time of detection. Contact tracing was carried out on the other passengers who traveled on the flight from London to Glasgow with her. Medical staff described her condition at the time as "as well as we can hope for at this stage."

On 4 January 2015, the Royal Free Hospital announced that her condition had deteriorated to critical, with her health later stabilising before she was declared no longer critically ill on 12 January. Cafferkey received blood plasma from William Pooley and has been treated with experimental drugs as part of her treatment. On 24 January, she was declared to be free of infection, and released from hospital.

== 2015 readmission to hospital ==
The prognosis after recovery from Ebola virus disease can include joint pains, muscular pain, skin peeling, or hair loss. In a media interview in September 2015, Cafferkey said "I’ve had trouble with my thyroid, lost some of my hair and get really sore joints but I guess side effects are to be expected."

It was found in 2015 that, after an apparent complete cure, with the bloodstream, saliva and organs such as the liver free of the Ebola virus, it can linger on in parts of the body not protected by the immune system, including fluid in the eye, the central nervous system and, in men, the testes and semen.

Cafferkey went to a 24-hour GP clinic in New Victoria Hospital in Glasgow on the night of 5 October 2015 and was diagnosed with "a virus" (unspecified) and sent home. 24 hours later she was admitted to Queen Elizabeth University Hospital where she was diagnosed with late complications caused by the Ebola virus hitherto considered unusual, and was flown by military jet to London, to the Royal Free Hospital. Her condition was initially described as serious and she was being treated in the high-level isolation unit. Doctors discovered that, after she had been deemed cured, the virus had remained in her cerebrospinal fluid and feared that it might be in her central nervous system. Personnel in Scotland monitored those whom she had come into contact with, since the virus can be spread through exposure to the infected person's body fluids, though they said the risk was likely to be small.

Cafferkey's condition declined rapidly, and on 14 October 2015 she was reported to be critically ill. Five days later, on 19 October 2015, the Royal Free Hospital announced that: "Pauline Cafferkey's condition has improved to serious but stable". On 21 October 2015 Dr Michael Jacobs, Cafferkey's doctor at the Royal Free Hospital, said at a televised press conference that Cafferkey was suffering from neurological complications from meningitis caused by Ebola virus, and had not been re-infected with Ebola, was being treated using a highly experimental anti-viral agent called GS-5734, and had significantly improved, although she remained in an isolation tent and was not well enough to get out of bed. Cafferkey had initially received monoclonal antibody treatment, the first person to receive it after previous treatment, but it was discontinued after she suffered a life-threatening anaphylactic reaction. On 12 November the Royal Free Hospital said that Cafferkey had made a full recovery and was no longer infectious. She was transferred to Glasgow's Queen Elizabeth University Hospital.

== 2016 readmissions ==
In February 2016, Cafferkey was admitted to Glasgow's Queen Elizabeth University Hospital after "routine monitoring by the Infectious Diseases Unit". On the same day she was transferred by a RAF plane to London where she was readmitted to the Royal Free Hospital. In a statement the Royal Free said she had been transferred to the hospital "due to a late complication from her previous infection by the Ebola virus" and that she was being treated by the hospital's infectious diseases team. On 24 February the hospital described her condition as "stable". On 28 February Cafferkey was discharged by the Royal Free Hospital. A spokesman said, "We can confirm that Pauline is not infectious. The Ebola virus can only be transmitted by direct contact with the blood or bodily fluids of an infected person while they are symptomatic."

On 6 October 2016 she was readmitted to the Queen Elizabeth University Hospital to be monitored by the infectious diseases team. A NHS Greater Glasgow and Clyde spokeswoman said that she was in a stable condition and undergoing investigations. In the evening of the same day a statement was issued stating that tests for the Ebola virus were negative.

== Investigations ==
In 2014, due to the fact that Cafferkey had passed through border controls and travelled on a domestic flight from Heathrow to Glasgow, criticism was levelled at current screening protocols at UK points of entry, which mainly consisted of taking a person's temperature and asking a series of questions. Public Health England stated that they were planning a review of the screening procedures.

In 2016, the Nursing and Midwifery Council initiated proceedings against Cafferkey, alleging that she had allowed an incorrect temperature to be recorded during the screening process upon returning to the UK from Sierra Leone in 2014. Following a two-day hearing in Edinburgh during September 2016, the charges against Cafferkey were dismissed and she was cleared of any wrongdoing. The disciplinary panel was told that she had been impaired by illness at the time and heard evidence about how the Public Health England screening centre at Heathrow Airport had been unprepared for a large influx of passengers and that it was "busy, disorganised and even chaotic". BBC Scotland reporter Philip Sim wrote: "It now seems as if the case against Pauline Cafferkey had fallen apart before the hearing even began - raising questions as to why she had to go through it in the first place". In November 2016, a second panel criticised fellow volunteer senior nurse Donna Wood for suggesting "let's put it down as 37.2 and get out of here and sort it out later". Wood was suspended for two months for failing to alert the authorities about Cafferkey's condition. Hannah Ryan, the doctor that agreed to record the incorrect temperature, was suspended for one month by the Medical Practitioners Tribunal in March 2017.

== Subsequent events ==
In April 2017, Cafferkey announced she would return to Sierra Leone in May to raise funds for Ebola survivors and children orphaned by the disease.

In June 2019, Cafferkey gave birth to twin sons in a hospital in Glasgow, at the age of 43. In a statement, she said "this shows that there is life after Ebola and there is a future for those who have encountered this disease".

== See also ==
- Ebola virus disease in the United Kingdom
