= Ebola in the United Kingdom =

Five cases of Ebola virus disease have been recorded in the United Kingdom. Three were health workers returning from treating victims of the Ebola virus epidemic in West Africa in 2014, 2015 and 2026, and a single case in 1976 occurred when a laboratory technician contracted the disease in a needlestick injury while handling samples from Africa. All cases recovered. No domestic transmission of Ebola has occurred in the United Kingdom.

== Infected in the UK and Ireland ==
On 5 November 1976, Geoffrey Platt, a laboratory technician at the former Microbiological Research Establishment in Porton Down, Wiltshire, contracted Ebola in an accidental needlestick injury from a contaminated needle while handling samples from Africa. He was treated with human interferon and convalescent serum. The course of his disease was mild and he fully recovered.

== Infected outside UK and Ireland ==
=== Nurse, 2014 ===
The high-level isolation unit at the Royal Free Hospital, in the Hampstead area of London, received its first case on 24 August 2014. William Pooley, a British nurse who contracted the disease while working in Sierra Leone as part of the relief effort for the Ebola virus epidemic in West Africa, was medically evacuated by the Royal Air Force on a specially-equipped C-17 aircraft. He was released from hospital on 3 September 2014. Pooley delivered the UK's Channel 4 television program Alternative Christmas message in 2014. He was reported to be planning to return to Sierra Leone on 19 October 2014. He also donated blood to support developing a cure for the disease.

=== Aid worker, 2014 ===
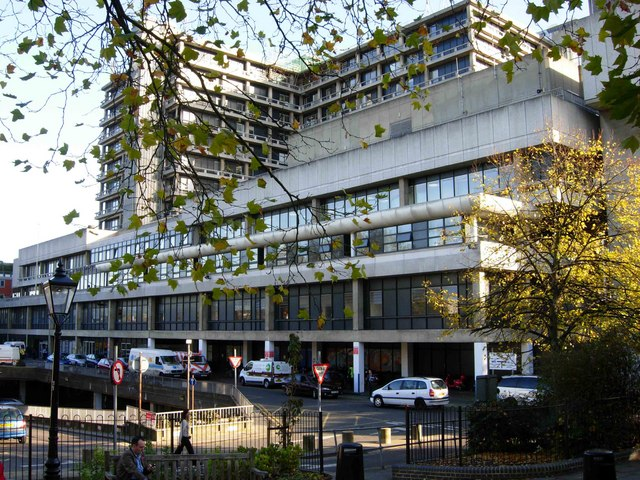
Royal Free Hospital, Hampstead

On 29 December 2014, Pauline Cafferkey, a Scottish aid worker who had just returned from an Ebola treatment centre in Kerry Town in Sierra Leone to Glasgow via Casablanca Airport and London Heathrow Airport, was diagnosed with Ebola virus disease at Glasgow's Gartnavel General Hospital. it was thought she contracted the virus as a result of wearing a visor instead of goggles. Criticism was levelled at screening protocols at UK points of entry, which mainly consisted of taking a person's temperature and asking a series of questions.

After initial treatment in Glasgow, she was transferred to the specialist high-level isolation unit at the Royal Free Hospital in London for longer-term treatment. Contact tracing was carried out on the other passengers who had traveled on the flight from London to Glasgow with her. In January 2015, she experienced a period of critical illness, and underwent intensive medical treatment. In January 2015 she was declared to be free of infection, and released from hospital.

In October 2015, Cafferkey was diagnosed with late complications caused by the Ebola virus hitherto considered unusual, and readmitted to the Royal Free Hospital. The virus had remained in her cerebrospinal fluid and was feared to be in her central nervous system. Her doctors stated that she had been critically ill due to neurological complications from meningitis, and that she had been treated using a highly experimental anti-viral agent. On 12 November the Royal Free Hospital said that Cafferkey had made a full recovery and was no longer infectious.

In February 2016, Cafferkey was readmitted to the Royal Free Hospital due to complications from her infection, but later that month declared not to be infectious and discharged. In October 2016, she was again admitted to hospital, monitored by the infectious diseases unit at Glasgow's Queen Elizabeth University Hospital, but tests for the Ebola virus were negative.

In 2016, proceedings were initiated against Cafferkey by the Nursing and Midwifery Council alleging that she had allowed an incorrect temperature to be recorded during the screening process upon returning to the UK from Sierra Leone in 2014. Following a hearing in September 2016, the charges against her were dismissed after the disciplinary panel was told that she had been impaired by illness at the time.

=== Military health worker, 2015 ===
On 11 March 2015, UK military health worker Corporal Anna Cross contracted the disease in Sierra Leone while volunteering as a nurse. After testing positive for Ebola she was flown home for treatment at Royal Free Hospital in London. On 27 March 2015, she became the first person in the world to be treated with the experimental Ebola drug MIL 77 and was released from hospital after making a full recovery.

=== Health worker, 2026 ===
On 5 November 2026, a male British health worker who tested positive for Ebola in the Democratic Republic of the Congo was flown home for treatment at Royal Free Hospital in London.

== Suspected cases ==
In January 2015, healthcare workers who had sustained needlestick injuries while caring for Ebola patients abroad were put under medical observation, but not found to have contracted the Ebola virus. On 16 March 2015, another UK worker was sent back to the United Kingdom from Sierra Leone due to fear of having contracted the virus. but did not test positive. On 17 November 2022, Colchester Hospital deep cleaned after a suspected case of the 2022 Uganda Ebola outbreak, which as of December was not confirmed as an Ebola case.

== Public health measures ==
In November 2014, Public Health England established the returning workers scheme, mandating organisations and businesses to register and provide travel details of all staff returning from Ebola affected areas before they travel back to the UK. In October 2022, the UK Health Security Agency issued a health alert asking providers to consider Ebola in the differential diagnosis of any patient with relevant symptoms returning from areas affected by the outbreak of Sudan ebolavirus in Uganda.

== See also ==
- United Kingdom aid efforts for the 2014 Ebola epidemic in West Africa
- List of Ebola outbreaks
- National Health Service (U.K.)
