= Cafferkey =

Cafferkey is a surname. Notable people with the surname include:

- Ger Cafferkey (born 1987), Irish Gaelic footballer
- Pauline Cafferkey, British nurse and aid worker
