= Royal Free Hospital =

- Royal Free London NHS Foundation Trust
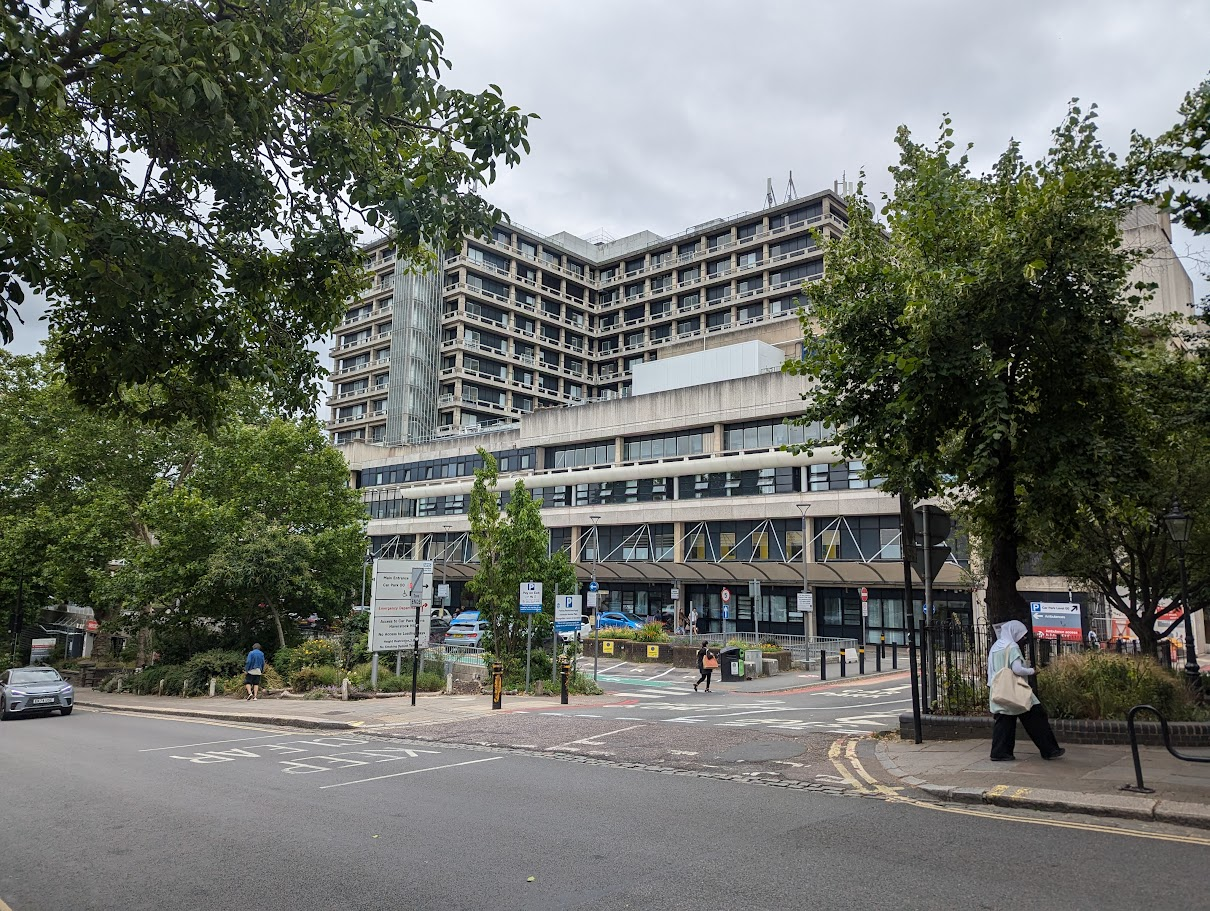
- Royal Free Hospital

- Location within Camden

Geography
- Location: Pond Street, Hampstead NW3 2QG, London, England
- Coordinates: 51°33′11″N 0°9′55″W

Organisation
- Care system: NHS England
- Type: Teaching
- Affiliated university: University College London; Middlesex University

Services
- Emergency department: Yes
- Beds: 839

History
- Founded: 1828; 198 years ago 1974; 52 years ago (present site)

Links
- Website: www.royalfree.nhs.uk/the-royal-free-hospital/
- Lists: Hospitals in England

The Royal Free Hospital (also known as the Royal Free) is a major teaching hospital in the Hampstead area of the London Borough of Camden. The hospital is part of the Royal Free London NHS Foundation Trust, which also runs services at Barnet Hospital, Chase Farm Hospital, North Middlesex University Hospital and a number of other sites. The trust is a founder member of the UCLPartners academic health science centre.

== History ==
=== Early history ===
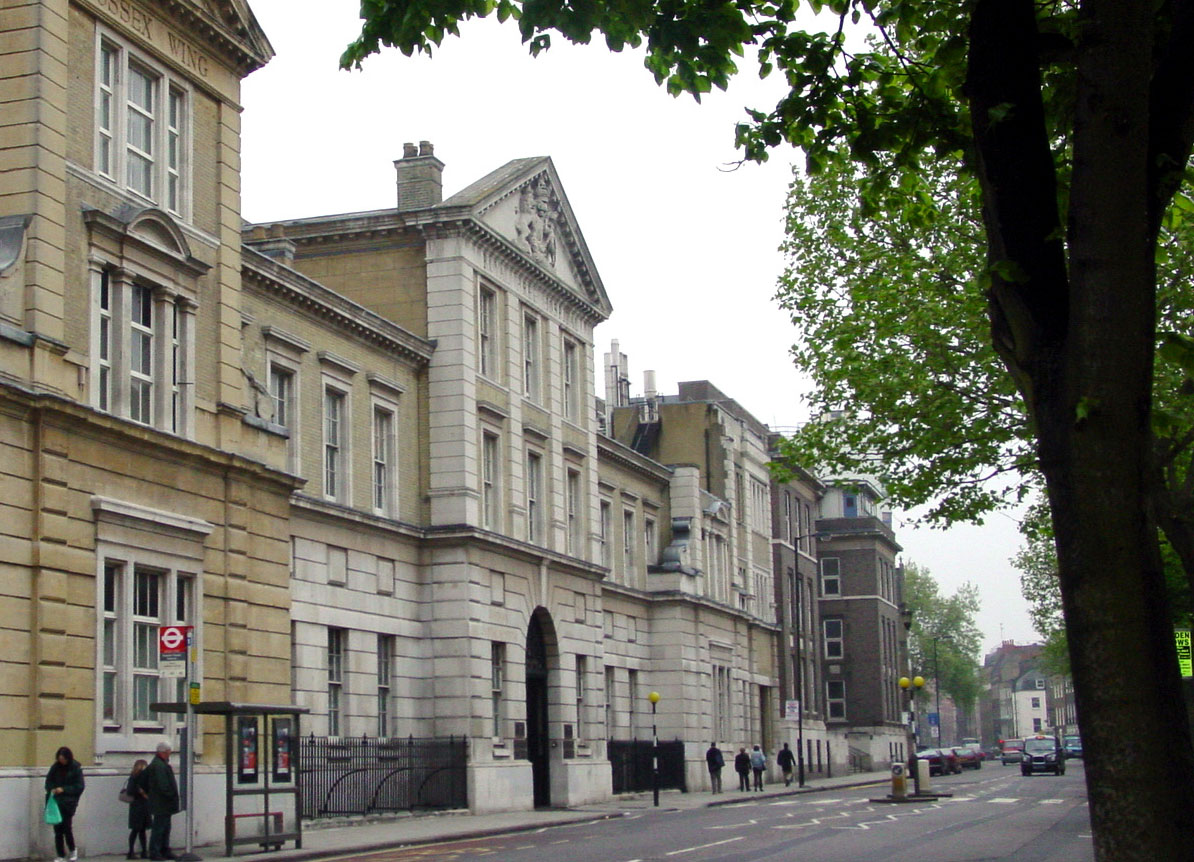
Former site on Gray's Inn Road, subsequently the Eastman Dental Hospital

What became the Royal Free Hospital was founded in 1828 by the surgeon William Marsden to provide free care to those of little means. It is said that one evening, Marsden found a young girl lying on the steps of St. Andrew Church, Holborn, dying from disease and hunger and sought help for her from one of the nearby hospitals. However, none would take the girl in and she died two days later. After this experience Marsden set up a small dispensary at 16 Greville Street, Holborn, called the London General Institution for the Gratuitous Care of Malignant Diseases. The hospital became the London Free Hospital in 1833, and the Free Hospital in 1835. A royal charter was granted by Queen Victoria in 1837 to what then became the Royal Free Hospital, after it was the only hospital to stay open during the 1826–1837 cholera epidemic and had cared for many victims.

As demand for in-patient facilities increased the hospital moved to the former barracks of the Light Horse Volunteers in Gray's Inn Road in 1844. The north wing of the former barracks, which was rebuilt and renamed the Sussex Wing after Prince Augustus Frederick, Duke of Sussex, a benefactor of the hospital, re-opened in 1856 and the south wing, which was rebuilt and renamed the Victoria Wing after Queen Victoria, re-opened in 1879. Meanwhile, the western elevation on Gray's Inn Road, which was rebuilt and renamed the Alexandra Building after the Princess of Wales, was re-opened by the Prince and Princess of Wales in July 1895. Some additional land was purchased and used to develop the Helena Building, named after Princess Helena: the building was completed in 1915 and served as the Royal Free Military Hospital for officers during the latter stages of the First World War before becoming the maternity wing after the war. The Eastman Dental Clinic opened in a building adjacent to the main hospital in 1929. The Victoria Wing was badly damaged by a V-1 flying bomb in July 1944 during the Second World War.

=== Royal Free disease ===
In 1955 an apparent outbreak of an infectious illness, involving fever and subsequent persisting fatigue along with other symptoms, affected 292 members of staff and forced the hospital's closure between 25 July and 5 October. There was subsequently some debate as to whether the episode was of an infectious cause, or just an example of mass hysteria. The outbreak was later found to have been a notable case in the UK of myalgic encephalomyelitis/chronic fatigue syndrome, and resulted in the coining of the disease's name.

=== Move to Hampstead ===
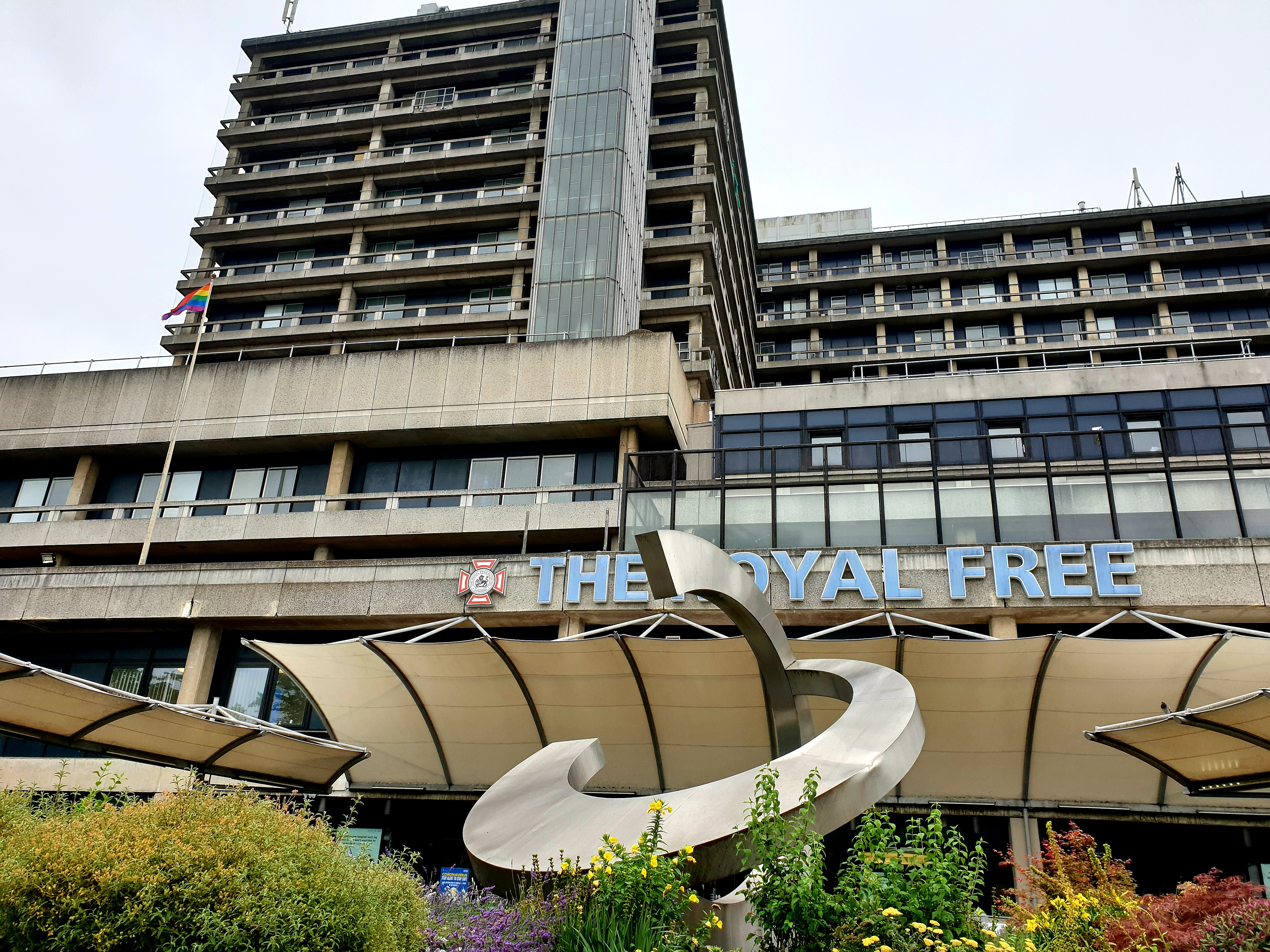
The north-facing elevation of The Royal Free in 2020

By the late 1960s the site on Gray's Inn Road had become too cramped, and a modern 12-storey cruciform tower block was built in Pond Street, Hampstead on the site of the former North-Western Fever Hospital and Hampstead General Hospital founded by William Heath Strange. It opened in 1974, and was officially opened by the Queen in 1978 on the Royal Free's 150th anniversary.

Meanwhile, the Eastman Dental Hospital took over the whole of the Gray's Inn Road site. The Royal Free was the first hospital in the UK to appoint a consultant in HIV medicine, in 1989. Professor Margaret Johnson, a specialist in thoracic medicine, built the Royal Free Centre for HIV Medicine, which is at the forefront of treatment of HIV-AIDS. The out-patients' centre was opened in 1992 by the actor Sir Ian McKellen and is named after the actor Ian Charleson.

=== Education ===
For a long time, the Royal Free was the only London hospital allowing women to study medicine, forming an association with the London School of Medicine for Women, under which women from the school completed their clinical studies at the hospital, from 1877. Under the Deanship of Elizabeth Garrett Anderson, one of the school's founders, it became part of the University of London and in 1896 became known as the London Royal Free Hospital School of Medicine for Women. In 1998 it merged with the University College Hospital's medical school to form the Royal Free and University College Medical School, renamed the UCL Medical School in 2008.

== Controversies ==
=== MMR vaccine controversy ===
In February 1998, the Royal Free held a press conference to coincide with the publication in The Lancet of a paper by Andrew Wakefield who claimed to have found a possible link between the MMR vaccine and autism. This started a controversy which led to a crisis in public confidence over MMR and a fall in uptake of the vaccine. Wakefield left the medical school in October 2001 and was later struck off the UK medical register by the General Medical Council following an investigation by The Sunday Times newspaper into the MMR issue.

=== Ekweremadu organ trafficking case ===
In February 2022 a Nigerian male was presented to a private renal unit at the Royal Free hospital, in an attempt to persuade doctors to carry out an £80,000 kidney transplant. For a fee, a medical secretary at the hospital acted as an interpreter between the man and the doctors, to try to convince them he was an altruistic donor. Later, Ike Ekweremadu was convicted of organ trafficking, along with his wife Beatrice, and a doctor, Obinna Obeta, with the aim of harvesting the man's kidney for Ekweremadu's daughter, Sonia. The court heard that Chris Agbo, an NHS consultant nephrologist at Hinchingbrooke hospital in Cambridgeshire, was paid by the Ekweremadus to facilitate the proposed transplant. Agbo also helped arrange a previous successful kidney transplant at the Royal Free, involving another man suspected of being trafficked from Nigeria, the jury was told.

== Facilities ==
The Royal Free Hospital has a high-level isolation unit equipped to treat highly infectious diseases such as Ebola virus disease. In 2014, the British nurse William Pooley was successfully treated for Ebola virus disease at the unit. In December 2014, Pauline Cafferkey, a British health worker diagnosed with Ebola in Glasgow was transferred to the unit for treatment. The unit has also previously been used to treat a patient with Crimean–Congo hemorrhagic fever.

Significant advances in the fields of liver medicine (hepatology) and transplantation; renal disease and dialysis; haematology and haemophilia have been made at the Royal Free, and the trust now treats all patients needing dialysis in north and central London. The department of liver medicine is recognised as one of the leading research units of its type in the world: it was founded by Professor Dame Sheila Sherlock.

The Royal Free Hospital Children's School (RFHCS) offers education to children who are patients on the paediatric wards at the Royal Free Hospital; it also offers education to children within the Royal Free Eating Disorder Service at Queen Mary's House, and to children with additional medical or mental health needs, in particular Emotionally Based School Avoidance behaviour, at the Konstam Centre in Highgate.

== Performance ==
The hospital was rated 'good' by the Care Quality Commission in September 2017. In a report of the Care Quality Commission completed in May 2019, Royal Free Hospital's overall surgical safety rating was downgraded from "good" to "requires improvement", due to a "large number" of "never events"—incidents so serious they should never have happened—which were partially related to "poor behaviours" by a few consultants at the Royal Free London NHS Trust and failures of the Trust's management.

== Transport ==
The Royal Free is near Belsize Park tube station and Hampstead Heath railway station, and on several bus routes. There are limited car parking facilities.

== Notable staff ==
- Rachael Annie Cox-Davies, matron from 1905 to 1922 and founding member of the Royal College of Nursing
- Charlotte Kratz MBE, FRCN, PhD (1922–2006) became the UK's first community health tutor at the Royal Free Hospital in 1965.

== See also ==
- Healthcare in London

== Bibliography ==
- "Our history". Royal Free London. NHS. 25 May 2018.
- "London School of Medicine for Women". UCL Bloomsbury Project. UCL. 2005. Archived from the original on 5 March 2016.
