= Isolation ward =

Medical ward designed to prevent the spread of infection

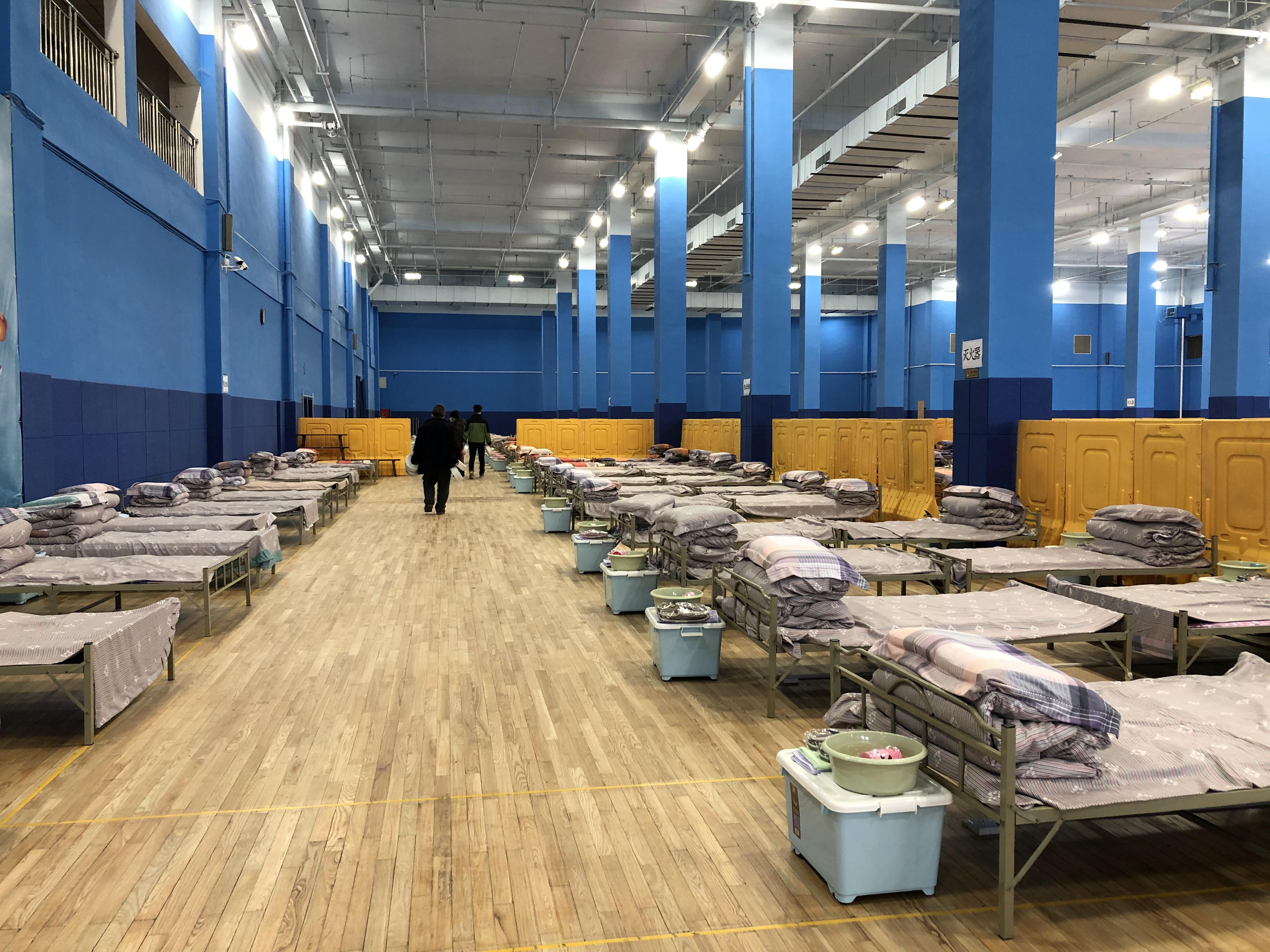
Sports centre requisitioned for the isolation and care of people infected with coronavirus disease 2019, in Wuhan (China).

In hospitals and other medical facilities, an isolation ward is a separate ward used to isolate patients with infectious diseases. Several wards for individual patients are usually placed together in an isolation unit.

== Design ==
In an isolation unit, several measures must be implemented in order to reduce the spread of infection. The units are generally placed away from the main hospital, and staff often only work in that unit. In some hospitals, the unit is placed in a separate building. Ventilation is important to reduce the transmission of airborne spores, and the most severely affected patients are placed in separate wards. However, in some circumstances, especially in areas experiencing a major epidemic, makeshift isolation wards can be constructed.

== Use ==
Isolation wards are used to isolate patients who pose a risk of passing a potentially harmful infection on to others. Such infections can range in severity widely, from diseases such as influenza to ebola, although more precautions are generally taken with diseases of a higher mortality rate. Outside major hospitals, isolation wards can be set up to control infection in crowded places, or those lacking substantial medical facilities. Many major passenger ships contain separate wards which can be converted for use in isolating patients.

== See also ==
- Barrier nursing
- Infection control
