= Responses to the West African Ebola virus epidemic =

- Emblem of the United Nations
- Duration: 2013–2016

Organizations from around the world responded to the West African Ebola virus epidemic. In July 2014, the World Health Organization (WHO) convened an emergency meeting with health ministers from eleven countries and announced collaboration on a strategy to co-ordinate technical support to combat the epidemic. In August, they declared the outbreak an international public health emergency and published a roadmap to guide and coordinate the international response to the outbreak, aiming to stop ongoing Ebola transmission worldwide within six to nine months. In September 2014, the United Nations Security Council declared the Ebola virus outbreak in the West Africa subregion a "threat to international peace and security" and unanimously adopted a resolution urging UN member states to provide more resources to fight the outbreak; the WHO stated that the cost for combating the epidemic will be a minimum of $1 billion.

The Economic Community of West African States (ECOWAS) and the World Bank Group pledged aid money and the World Food Programme announced plans to mobilize food assistance for an estimated 1 million people living in restricted access areas. Several non-governmental organizations provided assistance in the efforts to control the spread of the disease. The humanitarian aid organisation Médecins Sans Frontières (Doctors Without Borders) helped lead the global response to the crisis, maintaining several treatment centers in the area. Samaritan's Purse also provided direct patient care and medical support in Liberia; many nations and charitable organizations, foundations, and individuals also pledged assistance to control the epidemic.

The United Nations Mission for Ebola Emergency Response (UNMEER) was tasked with the overall planning and coordination of the response, directing the efforts of the UN agencies, national governments, and other humanitarian actors to the areas where they are most needed.

Calling Ebola healthcare workers "the ones who answered the call," in December 2014 the editors of Time magazine named the Ebola health workers as Person of the Year. Editor Nancy Gibbs said, "The rest of the world can sleep at night because a group of men and women are willing to stand and fight. For tireless acts of courage and mercy, for buying the world time to boost its defenses, for risking, for persisting, for sacrificing and saving, the Ebola fighters are Time's 2014 Person of the Year." Both Médecins Sans Frontières and Samaritan's Purse were singled out as organisations that responded very early in the epidemic with especially dedicated workers who had worked alongside local caregivers.

== United Nations ==
=== UN Mission for Ebola Emergency Response ===
On 18 September 2014, the United Nations Security Council declared the Ebola virus outbreak in the West Africa subregion a "threat to international peace and security". The Security Council unanimously adopted United Nations Security Council Resolution 2177, which urged UN member states to provide more resources to fight the outbreak. The resolution was the first in the history of the Security Council to deal with a public health crisis. It was sponsored by 131 countries, which – according to U.S. Ambassador to the United Nations Samantha Power – makes it the most broadly supported of the 2,176 Security Council resolutions since 1945. Therefore, the UN Security Council has created the first ever UN mission for a public health emergency, the United Nations Mission for Ebola Emergency Response (UNMEER), with the primary task of coordinating the UN agencies' vast resources to combat the epidemic under the leadership of the WHO. Dr. David Nabarro, the UN Secretary General's Senior Coordinator said that "This unprecedented outbreak requires an unprecedented response. The number of cases have doubled in these countries in the last three weeks. To get in front of this, the response must be increased 20-fold from where it is today."

UNMEER has been tasked to coordinate all relevant United Nations actors in order to ensure a rapid, effective, efficient and coherent response to the Ebola crisis. UNMEER's objective is to work with others to stop the Ebola outbreak. UNMEER will work closely with governments, regional and international actors, such as the African Union (AU) and the Economic Community of West African States (ECOWAS), and with UN Member States, the private sector and civil society. Accra, in Ghana, will serve as a base for UNMEER, with teams in Guinea, Liberia and Sierra Leone. A United Nations General Assembly document, the Report of the Secretary-General on UNMEER and the Office of the Special Envoy on Ebola (A/69/404), issued on 24 September 2014, details UNMEER's proposed mission, budget, and structure.

=== World Health Organization ===
In July 2014, the World Health Organization (WHO) convened an emergency sub-regional meeting with health ministers from eleven countries in Accra, Ghana to tackle the ongoing Ebola virus outbreak in West Africa. On 3 July, the West African states announced collaboration on a new strategy, and the creation of a WHO sub-regional centre in Guinea "to co-ordinate technical support"; the centre was inaugurated in Conakry on 24 July.

The WHO Regional Director for Africa, Luis Sambo, visited the affected countries from 21 to 25 July, meeting with political leaders, ministers of health, NGOs, and other agencies. He stressed the need to "promote behavioural change while respecting cultural practices." On 24 July, WHO's Director General met with agencies and donors in Geneva to facilitate an increase in funding and manpower to respond to the outbreak. On 31 July, the WHO and West Africa nations announced a requirement for $100 million in aid to help contain the disease.

WHO declared the outbreak an international public health emergency on 8 August, after a two-day teleconference of experts. On 11 August, they emphasised lack of supplies and capacity as one of the problems, while local awareness of the disease had increased. Revised guidelines on how to prevent the spread of the disease were released, updating guidelines from 2008.

On 28 August, the WHO published a roadmap to guide and coordinate the international response to the outbreak, aiming to stop ongoing Ebola transmission worldwide within 6–9 months. It simultaneously revised its cost estimate for the global resources required over the next six months up to $490 million. They report that they "are on the ground establishing Ebola treatment centres and strengthening capacity for laboratory testing, contact tracing, social mobilization, safe burials, and non-Ebola health care" and "continue to monitor for reports of rumoured or suspected cases from countries around the world." Other than cases where individuals are suspected or have been confirmed of being infected with Ebola, or have had contact with cases of Ebola, the WHO does not recommend any travel or trade restrictions.

On 16 September, the WHO Assistant Director General, Bruce Aylward, announced that the cost for combating the epidemic will be a minimum of $1 billion. "We don't know where the numbers are going on this," according to Aylward. There has been heavy criticism of WHO from some aid agencies because its response was perceived as slow and insufficient, especially during the early stage of the outbreak.

==== WHO Roadmap ====
The following are the key headings from the WHO roadmap for the international response to the epidemic, published on 28 August.

A. Immediate actions to support the three EVD affected countries
- 1 Urgently strengthen the field response
  - Output 1: A local response team is in place in each "hot spot"
  - Output 2: Provision of field logistical support including Personal Protective Equipment supply and local laboratory facilities capacity
  - Output 3: Provision of care to patients with effective infection prevention and control in health care settings
  - Output 4: Chains of transmission broken through active surveillance, case investigation, contact tracing and follow-up
  - Output 5: Public relations and reputation management, social mobilization, and risk communications strengthened
- 2. Coordinate the outbreak response
  - 2.1. Manage the WHO Sub-regional Ebola Operations Coordination Centre
    - Output 1: Field coordination, collaboration and operational management of the outbreak response strengthened
    - Output 2: Cross-border coordination strengthened
  - 2.2. WHO's leadership and coordination of EVD outbreak response strengthened at all levels
    - Output 1: Logistics management systems strengthened to support response activities
    - Output 2: Disease-related and other content-based expert support provided for risk assessment and expert networks mobilized
    - Output 3: Global communication and information provided
    - Output 4: External relations strengthened
    - Output 5: Clinical support strengthened
    - Output 6: Development of new medical treatments and interventions against EVD advanced

B. Preparedness in countries at-risk

- Output 1: Preparedness plans activated and tested
- Output 2: Active surveillance strengthened
- Output 3: Laboratory diagnostic capacity strengthened
- Output 4: Public information and social mobilization enhanced
- Output 5: Case management and infection prevention and control capacities strengthened

==== UNMEER Program ====
During October, WHO and UNMEER announced a comprehensive 90-day plan to control and reverse the epidemic of EVD. The immediate objective is to isolate at least 70% of EVD cases and safely bury at least 70% of patients who die from EVD by 1 December 2014 (the 60-day target) - this has become known as the 70:70:60 program. The ultimate goal is to have capacity in place for the isolation of 100% of EVD cases and the safe burial of 100% of casualties by 1 January 2015 (the 90-day target). Many nations and charitable organizations are cooperating to realise this plan. A WHO situation report in mid-December indicated that the international community was on track to meet the 90-day target.

=== World Food Programme ===
On 18 August, the World Food Programme (WFP) of the United Nations announced plans to mobilize food assistance for an estimated 1 million people living in restricted access areas. In an 18 September WHO Ebola Response Roadmap Situation Report it was reported that as of that date the WFP have delivered an estimated 3,000 metric tonnes of food to the worst affected areas, enough to feed 147,500 people. They have also assisted in the transportation of 400 cubic meters of medical cargo. The WFP-led Logistics Cluster provides free logistics services, such as storage, transport, coordination and information management, to WHO and other health and humanitarian actors. WFP has launched a regional emergency operation to reach 1.3 million people in health centres and quarantine areas. WFP provides food and logistical assistance alongside national governments, the World Health Organization (WHO) and other partners to support the treatment of Ebola patients and mitigate the risk of the virus moving into new areas. The three pillars of WFP support in the Ebola crisis are to deliver food alongside the health response, ensure the movement of partner staff and equipment, and provide logistical services and infrastructure support for health partners.

=== Food and Agriculture Organization ===
The Food and Agriculture Organization of the United Nations has launched a $30 million campaign to help stop the spread of the disease, meet immediate and long-term food and nutrition security needs and build resilience. In addition, it is training its network of field agents and extension staff to understand to how stop the spread of the disease by simple measures of control and hygiene, and to promulgate this knowledge in their communities. The FAO-led social mobilization campaign is expected to reach 9,000 households in Guinea; similar campaigns will follow in Liberia and Sierra Leone.

=== UNICEF ===

The United Nations Children's Fund (UNICEF) has a $200 million program to respond to the Ebola outbreak - part of the $1 billion total UN program. Of this, $65 million will go to UNICEF's programmes in Liberia, $61 million to Sierra Leone and $55 million to Guinea. An additional $10 million will help neighbouring countries be prepared for a potential spread of the disease within their borders, with the remaining $9 million required for regional coordination efforts. UNICEF estimates that 8.5 million children and young people under the age of 20 live in areas affected by Ebola in Guinea, Sierra Leone and Liberia. Of these, 2.5 million are under the age of five. The program's immediate focus is to help contain the spread of the disease and address communities immediate needs.

UNICEF is one of the largest agencies providing essential supplies for use in treatment and care centres and for continuity of basic services. By 8 October, more than 900 metric tonnes of supplies were delivered to the region in support of partners, through a total of 73 flights.

== International organizations ==
=== African Development Bank ===
The African Development Bank has contributed over $220 million.

=== African Union ===
In October, the African Union appealed for its members to send health-care workers to the three West African countries. On October 28, it was announced that they had received substantial pledges; among others, the East African Community has promised 600 personnel, Ethiopia 210, and Congo 200. In total it is hoped that Africa's contribution will reach 2,000 personnel, of whom one-sixth are currently ready for deployment.

=== Economic Community of West African States ===
In March, the Economic Community of West African States (ECOWAS) disbursed US$250,000 to deal with the outbreak. In response to the ECOWAS Special Fund for the Fight against Ebola, in July the Nigerian government donated us$3.5 million to Liberia, Guinea, Sierra Leone, the West African Health Organization, and the ECOWAS Pool Fund, to aid in the fight against the epidemic.

=== European Union ===
The European Commission has committed €600 million ($760 million) funding to fight the outbreak, including the provision of mobile laboratories, funding to strengthen healthcare capacity, support to help cushion the macroeconomic impact, support to the deployment of medical missions by partner organisations, and funding for vaccine research and trials.

On 24 October, the European Council announced that contributions by the European Commission and individual member states come to a combined total of €1 billion ($1.3 billion). By March 2015, the total contributed had reached €1.2bn ($1.3).

=== Innovative Medicines Initiative ===
The Innovative Medicines Initiative, which is part funded by the European Union, in January 2015 announced eight projects on Ebola, to accelerate all aspects of vaccine development and manufacturing as well as deployment and compliance with vaccine regimens and diagnostics. The total budget of the eight projects launched is €215 million.

=== International Charter on Space and Major Disasters ===
On October 9, 2014, the International Charter on Space and Major Disasters was activated by the USGS on behalf of the National Geospatial Agency to monitor the outbreak (in Sierra Leone, specifically), the first time its space assets have been used in an epidemiological role.

=== World Bank Group ===
The World Bank Group has pledged US$230 million in emergency funding to help Guinea, Liberia, and Sierra Leone contain the spread of Ebola infections, help their communities cope with the economic impact of the crisis, and improve public health systems throughout West Africa. On 25 September The World Bank made additional funding of $170 million available to help curtail the spread of the Ebola virus. The funds will be used to finance medical supplies and increase the number of healthcare workers.

On 30 October a further $100 million funding was announced, bringing the cumulative total to $500 million. The latest tranche will go towards setting up a coordination hub to recruit, train and deploy qualified foreign health workers and support the three countries' efforts to isolate Ebola patients and bury the dead safely, the bank said.

== National responses ==
=== Measures to protect national security ===
Many governments across the world have put measures in place which are aimed at preventing the possible spread of Ebola into their countries, and to prepare an appropriate response in order to protect their populations from Ebola. These include:

- Advisory notices to warn travellers of the potential risk of travel to countries affected by the epidemic. (Germany, Spain, UK, USA, Colombia, Philippines, Saudi Arabia.)
- Withholding visitor visas from nationals of the affected countries, closing borders, cancelling flights and restrictions on ships arriving in their ports. (Equatorial Guinea, Kenya, Sri Lanka, Nigeria, South Africa, Chad, Seychelles, Mauritania, Belize, Guinea-Bissau, Australia, Mexico, Canada)
- Precautions such as isolation facilities, training of staff, biocontainment exercises, and health screening for incoming travellers. (Malta, Colombia, India, South Africa, Morocco, Mali, Germany, Philippines, Mauritania, United States, Canada, Rwanda, France, UK)

=== Countries bordering the affected region ===
==== Ivory Coast ====
In August, the Ivory Coast, announced the closure of its land borders with neighbouring countries Guinea and Liberia affected by the Ebola outbreak. The sale and consumption of bushmeat has been banned.

==== Mali ====
Mali, which shares a border with Guinea, has implemented a contingency plan for prevention of Ebola Virus Disease. This involves a strong prevention system in several locations along the border, screening of incoming air passengers, a toll free phone number for notifying suspected cases, and stockpiles of drugs and equipment.

=== Humanitarian responses ===
The following countries have pledged resources, expertise, or funds to the international effort in West Africa:-

==== Australia ====
Australia announced on 17 September that it will commit an additional 7 million Australian dollars to help the international response to the Ebola outbreak in West Africa, bringing the total committed to AU$8 million. The funds will be divided between support to the British government's response, the World Health Organization, and Medecins Sans Frontieres. However MSF has declined the donation, saying that what's needed instead is a specialised deployment of civil and military assets. Subsequently, the Australian government has agreed to assist several hundred Australian expert volunteers to travel to one of the Ebola hotspots of Africa to help control the epidemic.

==== Brazil ====
In response to the request for international cooperation made by the World Health Organization, Brazil's Health Ministry has donated a number of medical kits to affected countries. Each kit comprises 1.2 tons of supplies including antibiotics, anti-inflammatories, gloves and masks, sufficient to treat 500 patients for three months. Four kits have been allocated to Guinea, five to Sierra Leone and five more to Liberia.

==== Canada ====
On 12 August, the Public Health Agency of Canada (PHAC) announced that the country would donate between 800 and 1,000 doses of an untested vaccine (VSV-EBOV) to the WHO. The offer was made by the Minister of Health directly to the Director General of the WHO as part of the country's commitment to containment efforts. The Government of Canada holds the patent associated with the vaccine, but has licensed BioProtection Systems of Ames, Iowa to develop the product for use in humans.

By 20 October, Canada had pledged 65.4 million Canadian dollars to the fight against Ebola. As part of its contribution, Canada has deployed two mobile diagnostic laboratories in Sierra Leone, and shipped the first batch of an experimental Ebola vaccine to the WHO in Geneva.

==== China ====
In August, China sent their second donation of supplies to Guinea, Sierra Leone, and Liberia. The supplies, worth 30 million yuan (4.9 million US dollars), included medical protective clothes, disinfectants, thermo-detectors, and medicines. China has also sent three expert teams composed of epidemiologists and specialists in disinfection and protection.

Some Chinese companies in West Africa have also joined the relief efforts. China Kingho Group, a leading exploration and mining company in Sierra Leone, donated 400 million leones (about $90,000) to the government and people of Sierra Leone on 15 August.

On 25 September, a second mobile lab landed at Lungi Airport in Sierra Leone. The lab would assist the 29 CDC workers experts from China already in the region to help fight the disease.

On 24 October, China announced a fourth round of emergency funding bringing its commitments now to a total of 500 million yuan - to be used to set up a treatment center in Liberia, and to increase the number of Chinese medical staff working in West Africa to fight the epidemic. China has also contributed to the World Food Program activities in the area.

On 31 October, China announced that a medical squad of the People's Liberation Army (PLA), which has experience from a 2002 outbreak of SARS, would build a 100-bed treatment center in Liberia.

From 2014 to 2015, the PLA deployed 524 medical staff on a rotational basis to combat the outbreak in Liberia, Sierra Leone, Guinea, and Guinea-Bissau.

==== Cuba ====
On 10 September, Cuba announced its willingness to help curtail the spread of the disease with a plan to send 165 doctors, nurses and infection control specialists to Sierra Leone on a six-month rotation. Having completed a training program, the first group of these arrived in Freetown on 2 October.

On 27 September, Cuba announced it is preparing to send a further 296 healthcare workers to Liberia and Guinea.

==== Egypt ====
In October, Egypt sent three tons of medical aid, consisting of medicine and medical equipment.

==== Ethiopia ====
In October 2014, it was announced that Ethiopia would send approximately 200 volunteer health workers to West Africa. The country also donated $500,000 to affected countries.

==== France ====
France has committed €70 million in aid to fight the epidemic. This includes the provision of clinical testing facilities and the construction of a 50-bed treatment centre which will be managed by the French Red Cross. Additionally they are supporting other organisations working in the area and the wider international effort. The country also dispatched 20 experts from the EPRUS institute to Guinea to fight the spread of the events. The Pasteur Institute also plans to set up a center of expertise in Conakry in order to provide improved responses in the future.

==== Germany ====
The German government announced on 19 September, that its contributions to the fight against Ebola had reached a total of euro 17 million to date. This includes contributions to the World Health Organization, Medecins sans Frontieres, and other agencies. Material contributions include air transport to the region and a treatment station for Liberia.

On 22 September Ursula von der Leyen, the German defense minister, has asked volunteers from their military contingent to assist in staffing a clinic in the epidemic region. The minister appealed to soldiers to "voluntarily make yourselves available for this unusual mission."

On 16 October the German government announced an increased contribution of €102 million for fighting the outbreak, following criticism that little had been done regarding Berlin's pledge to help the region deal with the Ebola outbreak. The new pledge represents a six-fold increase compared to its €17 million contribution. Then-Foreign Minister Frank-Walter Steinmeier stated that "We have underestimated the disastrous consequences of Ebola" and that "The race to catch up begins now."

On 22 November Germany sent 400 specially adapted motorbikes to worst hit areas of West Africa. The bikes will be used in the remote areas to rush test samples to testing laboratories, thus reducing the result time from 9 or more days to less than 24 hours.

Following a request made via the EU Civil Protection Mechanism, in January 2015 Germany dispatched a specialized medical airplane to West Africa in order to allow for speedy evacuation of EU volunteers to European hospitals.

==== Ghana ====
On 30 August, the Ghanaian Presidency released a press statement, announcing the country's willingness to use Accra as a support base to help fight Ebola in the stricken countries. This agreement follows a telephonic meeting with the United Nations chief, Ban Ki-moon and John Dramani Mahama, the President of Ghana. Accra will serve as a base for air lifting medical and other supplies to countries affected by the Ebola outbreak, as well as personnel to curtail the disease. In the coming months Ghana will play a major role in the fight against the disease in the region. The city of Accra will be the designated base for UNMEER, the newly formed mission by the UN.

==== India ====
India has given 10 million dollars to the UN Secretary General`s Fund for Ebola and 2 million dollars for the purchase of protective gear for health workers in the affected regions. India has also offered to contribute to the research for developing affordable drugs for cure or vaccination. Prior to this, India had contributed $500,000 to augment the WHO efforts to prevent the spread of Ebola virus.

==== Ireland ====
Ireland has provided direct funding of almost €3 million for Ebola treatment facilities in both Sierra Leone and Liberia, as well as for contact-tracing, community sensitisation and child nutrition programmes.

==== Israel ====
Israel has contributed $8.75 million to the UN's Ebola Response Multi-Partner Trust Fund to help stop the spread of the disease. In addition the Israeli government has sent six cargo containers full of special equipment used to set up portable field hospitals. The medical staff attached to the hospitals provided training to local medical professionals regarding the use of medical equipment, as well as focusing on "preventing the spread of the disease and raising awareness among populations with high potential for infection."

==== Japan ====
In April, the Government of Japan gave $520,000 through the United Nations Children's Fund (UNICEF) to support the Ebola outbreak response in Guinea. In August, another $1.5 million in additional support was provided to be disbursed via the WHO, UNICEF and Red Cross, and will be used for measures to prevent Ebola infections and to provide medical supplies.

On 25 August, Japanese authorities announced that they would be willing to provide access to an anti-influenza drug currently under development called favipiravir to try to treat EVD patients. Fujifilm Holdings Corp and MediVector have reportedly approached the U.S. Food and Drug Administration to request approval for this experimental use of favipiravir. Up to 20,000 doses of favipiravir would currently be available.

==== Malaysia ====
Malaysia plans to send more than 20 million medical gloves to Guinea, Liberia, Nigeria and Sierra Leone to alleviate a shortage of medical supplies in the affected countries. Malaysia will also send medical gloves to the Democratic Republic of Congo which is also dealing with an Ebola outbreak unrelated to the one affecting West Africa.

==== Netherlands ====
The Dutch government has pledged over €35 million to combat the disease. This includes donations to Médecins Sans Frontières (MSF), the Red Cross, the UN and UNICEF. In addition, a naval ship carrying relief supplies has deployed to West Africa on 6 November with a cargo which has been provided by nine EU member states. The supplies include a significant number of lorries, ambulances, mobile laboratories and other vehicles; generators, rubber gloves and boots, and other medical supplies.

==== New Zealand ====
The New Zealand Government has agreed to send 24 doctors and nurses to Sierra Leone to join international efforts against Ebola, at a cost of $2 million. The volunteers would join the Australian-led mission.

==== Nigeria ====
On Friday 5 November volunteer medical workers arrived in Liberia and Sierra Leone from Nigeria. The first arrivals included 100 volunteers in Freetown, Sierra Leone and a further 76 in Liberia. Nigeria has announced it will be sending 600 volunteers in the coming weeks to help stem the spread of the disease.

==== Norway ====
On 31 October, Norway announced that they will send 200 medical workers to Sierra Leone, in 4 teams of 50 each. The workers will help to run a treatment centre which has been set up by the British government. Norway will also establish an accommodation camp for between 50 and 100 health workers in Moyamba.

In a separate announcement, Norway has donated $2.7 million to the African Union Support to Ebola Outbreak in West Africa (ASEOWA).

==== Portugal ====
On the 18th of October, it was announced that Portugal would set up a medical base at the Hospital Militar in Bissau, the capital of Guinea-Bissau, to prevent and combat Ebola in case the epidemic crosses its border with Guinea. The base is intended to complement an Ebola treatment center which the Bissau government plans to set up in the Hospital Simão Mendes, the country's main hospital. However no date has been decided for this program to start.

==== Russia ====
Russia has allocated $19 million to help fight the virus. The funds are to be divided between humanitarian aid projects, research, preparations for a national outbreak of Ebola, and strengthening international efforts to battle the virus, including those led by the World Health Organization. In January 2015, the mining company Rusal constructed and opened a treatment and research center in the city of Kindia in Guinea at a cost of $10 million. In February of that same year, Russia delivered 37 tonnes of humanitarian aid to Guinea, including food supplies and medical instruments.

==== Taiwan ====
The Government of Taiwan gave $1 million to the U.S. Centers for Disease Control and Prevention (CDC). The donation was made to the CDC Foundation's Global Disaster Response Fund which provides materials from protective gear to vehicles used to provide transportation for medical workers.

Taiwan also donated 100,000 units of coveralls and surgical masks to Guinea, Liberia, and Sierra Leone.

==== Uganda ====
In August 2014 a team of 14 health workers from Uganda, which has "strong experience" of working with domestic Ebola outbreaks, had been deployed by the WHO to JFK Hospital in Monrovia, Liberia. On 27 October 2014 it was announced that a further 30 health workers had been dispatched to affected countries in West Africa.

==== United Kingdom ====
The UK government announced it has pledged £427 million ($635 million) to lead the global effort in Sierra Leone to contain, control and defeat the disease in that country. Previously published information from the UK states this includes support for 700 Ebola treatment beds in at least five treatment centres that the UK will build. These centres will provide medical care for up to 8,800 patients per six months. Britain also said it will support the establishment of 200 community care centres where people who believe they may have contracted Ebola can get a diagnosis and medical care.

On 2 October the UK hosted, alongside the Government of Sierra Leone, an international conference in London to rally the global community to provide an effective international response. The conference brought together more than 20 governments, a dozen charities and NGOs, the UN, World Bank, health experts and the private sector to pledge funds, equipment and health workers.

In October 2014, the Ministry of Defence said 750 personnel will be deployed to help with the establishment of Ebola Treatment Centres and an Ebola Training Academy including:

- The deployment of naval ship RFA Argus, involving around 250 personnel, to take and support three Merlin helicopters, aircrew and engineers in the region to provide crucial transport support to medical teams and aid experts.
- Over 200 military staff to run and staff a World Health Organization-led Ebola training facility that will assist in the training of healthcare workers, logisticians and hygiene specialists who are needed to staff treatment units. With UK support, WHO are now training over 120 health workers every week.
- 300 military personnel making up the existing UK taskforce plans focussed on delivering support to the Sierra Leone Government. This includes command and control, logistics and engineers that will provide the backbone of infrastructure, commodities, training and management needed to scale up the response in Sierra Leone. Units involved include 22 Field Hospital, 35 Squadron, 5 Armoured Medical Regiment, Royal Army Medical Corps, soldiers from the Queen's Own Gurkha Logistic Regiment and 1st Battalion The Royal Regiment of Scotland.

As of 12 October, the Department for International Development said aid supplies delivered so far include: 20 vehicles including ambulances; 75 water tanks; 3 incinerators for disposing of clothing and other materials; 12 generators; personal protection equipment; radio equipment; lighting sets; chlorine for sanitation; latrine slabs; temporary warehouse tents; 14 air conditioning units and isolator equipment.

Wellcome Trust

The UK government is co-funding clinical trials to find a safe vaccine for Ebola. Ten thousand doses of the drug are already being manufactured alongside the clinical trial in the hope that it will be approved for use in the coming months. A £6.5 million research initiative has been announced jointly by the Department for International Development and the Wellcome Trust to better inform the management of Ebola outbreaks.

Prime Minister David Cameron wrote to members of the European Council in October 2014 asking leaders to agree a new package of measures to tackle the Ebola crisis.

On 22 November over 30 NHS volunteers flew over to Freetown, Sierra Leone to assist with the Ebola epidemic. By January 2015, 1,600 British National Health Service (NHS) staff had volunteered to travel to west Africa and help those affected by Ebola.

==== United States ====
By the beginning of August, the United States Centers for Disease Control and Prevention (CDC) had placed staff in Guinea, Sierra Leone, Liberia, and Nigeria to assist the local Ministries of Health and WHO-led response to the outbreak. On 8 September, United States President Barack Obama announced that the United States government would send military personnel to the epidemic area. The military would assist in the setting up of isolation units and would provide additional safety to health workers in the area. The military would also assist in providing transportation of medical equipment. President Obama added that the steps are necessary to curtail the spread of the virus. The announcement came amid fears that the virus might mutate and become more virulent and "represents a serious national security concern." The United States also plans to send 400,000 home protective kits to the four counties in Liberia that have been hit the hardest by Ebola. The kit will include protective gear for family members, gloves and masks, disinfectants, and fever-reducing drugs.

On 8 September, the Department of Defense announced that it had allocated $22 million to set up a 25-bed field hospital in Liberia to treat healthcare workers affected by the Ebola virus. On 9 September, the United States Agency for International Development (USAID) announced that it would support the African Union's deployment of approximately 100 health workers to West Africa to manage and run Ebola treatment units.

Barack Obama calls Ebola a national security priority and announces the US will establish a military command center in Liberia. United States Department of Defense video, 17 September 2014

On 16 September, President Obama announced that the Department of Defense would take the lead in overseeing the response to the epidemic. The military would dispatch up to 3,000 personnel to West Africa in an effort that could cost up to $750 million over the next six months. U.S. Major General Darryl A. Williams, Commander, United States Army Africa, would be in place in Monrovia, Liberia, within the week to lead the effort. The general would head a regional command based in Liberia that would help oversee and coordinate U.S. and international relief efforts while a new, separate regional staging base in Senegal would help accelerate transportation of urgently needed equipment, supplies and personnel. In addition, the U.S. Department of Defense would send engineers to set up 17 treatment centers in Liberia — each with a 100-bed capacity — and would set up a site in the region to train up to 500 health-care workers a week. The President said that the armed forces "are going to bring their expertise in command and control, in logistics, in engineering" to help do tasks ranging from bringing in aid workers and medical equipment to distributing supplies and information kits to families in high-risk areas so they can take the appropriate precautions. However, the CDC warned on 20 September that there may be insufficient staff for the new treatment facilities that the international community was building.

On October 6, the White House released a fact sheet detailing the key elements of the US response. These include:

- deployment of medical personnel, equipment, and military logistical resources generally to the area but with a focus on Liberia;
- construction of treatment, logistics and training centers
- measures to screen incoming travellers and prevent spread of the disease within the US.

The United States Africa Command, working through United States Army Africa, has designated the Army's response to the epidemic as Operation United Assistance.

== Charitable organizations and foundations ==
=== Médecins Sans Frontières ===
According to a WHO report released on 18 September, the humanitarian aid organisation Médecins Sans Frontières (Doctors Without Borders) is the leading organization responding to the crisis. Médecins Sans Frontières has campaigned since the beginning of the epidemic for a better response from governments and international agencies. Speaking at a United Nations (UN) briefing on 2 September, Joanne Liu, international president of Médecins Sans Frontières, criticized the lack of assistance from UN member countries.

"Six months into the worst Ebola epidemic in history, the world is losing the battle to contain it. In West Africa, cases and deaths continue to surge. Riots are breaking out. Isolation centers are overwhelmed. Health workers on the front lines are becoming infected and are dying in shocking numbers. Others have fled in fear, leaving people without care for even the most common illnesses. Entire health systems have crumbled. Ebola treatment centers are reduced to places where people go to die alone, where little more than palliative care is offered. It is impossible to keep up with the sheer number of infected people pouring into facilities. In Sierra Leone, infectious bodies are rotting in the streets."

Médecins Sans Frontières has collaborated since March 2014 with CartONG and the Humanitarian OpenStreetMap Team (HOT) to map the areas impacted by the Ebola outbreak, especially roads, buildings, and place names. These efforts started in Guinea, then were extended to Sierra Leone and Liberia. The data and maps are also being used by the Red Cross.

On 30 October, MSF announced that its budget for Ebola response was €51 million for 2014, with further budget requirement for 2015. They currently have a total of 3,347 staff working in Guinea, Liberia and Sierra Leone, operating 6 treatment centres.

The Lasker-Bloomberg Public Service Award for 2015 was awarded to MSF for its leadership role in a public health emergency. This included their efforts against the Ebola outbreak.

=== International Federation of Red Cross and Red Crescent Societies ===
The International Federation of Red Cross and Red Crescent Societies has allocated a budget of more than 100 million Swiss francs to the Ebola crisis. It is running an Ebola Treatment Centre in Kenema, Sierra Leone as well as focusing on community engagement and safe burials throughout the region.

=== GOAL ===
The humanitarian charity GOAL is working in Sierra Leone, focused on public health information dissemination and establishing and supporting child protection systems, while also providing critical logistic and material support to health facilities, surveillance teams and partner organisations.

=== International Medical Corps ===
The International Medical Corps is operating two Ebola Treatment Units - one in Sierra Leone and another in Liberia - as well as conducting community awareness programs and training of teachers and health workers.

=== Bill & Melinda Gates Foundation ===
On 10 September, the Bill & Melinda Gates Foundation released $50 million to the United Nations and other international aid agencies fighting the epidemic. The foundation also donated $2 million to the CDC to assist them with their burden. Previous donations consisted of $5 million to the WHO and $5 million to UNICEF to buy medical supplies and fund support efforts in the region. "We are working urgently with our partners to identify the most effective ways to help them save lives now and stop transmission of this deadly disease," the Foundation CEO said in a statement.

=== Direct Relief ===
On September 20, Direct Relief, in coordination with Clinton Global Initiative Members, chartered a 747 filled with 100 tons of supplies for Ebola-hit regions. Valued at $6 million, the cargo of 2.8 million surgical and exam gloves, 170,000 coverall gowns, 120,000 masks, 40,000 liters of pre-mixed oral rehydration solution, and 9.8 million doses of essential medications was the largest single emergency shipment to date from the U.S. to the region.

=== Paul G. Allen Family Foundation ===
On 11 September, the Paul G. Allen Family Foundation pledged $9 million to the CDC. The funds will be appropriated to build treatment co-ordination centers and assist in training programs. This follows their earlier donation of $2.8 million, in August, to the Red Cross.

On 23 October Paul Allen, co-founder of Microsoft Inc., announced a personal pledge of US$100 million to provide for medevac facilities, training of health workers, supplies and medical personnel to combat the outbreak. The funds will be donated to a number of established aid and emergency organisations, including UNICEF, MSF, American Red Cross, and CDC Foundation.

On 6 November the Paul G. Allen Family Foundation announced $3.25 million in grants in support of Ebola relief efforts. The grants were issued to Direct Relief, Action Against Hunger, and Americares.

=== Samaritan's Purse ===
Samaritan's Purse has provided direct patient care in multiple locations in Liberia. On 1 October, Samaritan's purse airlifted 100 tons of supplies to Liberia, including tents, infection control kits, and caregiver kits intended to equip Community Care Centers and facilitate safe home-based support. The flight signals a new focus on establishing and supervising community-based treatment in the area.

=== Wellcome Trust ===
The Wellcome Trust announced on 23 September, a £3.2 million grant to fast-track trials of the most promising Ebola treatments. This will enable multiple partners around the world to quickly establish clinical trials at existing Ebola treatment centres in West Africa, where treatments can be formally evaluated in patients with Ebola virus disease. On 29 October, the Wellcome Trust announced that it is funding multiple vaccine trials in Europe, Gabon, Kenya, and the USA. This brings the Trust's total funding of Ebola research to approximately £10m.

=== GAVI ===
Gavi, the Vaccine Alliance, has committed up to US$300 million to procure vaccines, which could be used to immunise at risk populations. Gavi will be ready to act as soon as a safe, effective vaccine is recommended for use by the World Health Organization. Up to an additional US$90 million could be used to support countries to introduce the vaccines and to rebuild and restore immunisation services for all vaccines in Ebola-affected countries.

In December 2016, it was announced that an experimental Ebola vaccine produced by Merck was found to be "highly protective" against the virus after trial runs involving 11,000 people in Guinea. Previously, a 2015 study in medical journal The Lancet reported that the vaccine was 100 percent effective after tests on 4000 people in Guinea who had been in close contact with Ebola patients. Gavi global alliance signed a $5 million advance to buy the vaccine and help expedite the licensing and WHO approval process.

In April 2017, a panel of researchers from U.S. National Academy of Medicine questioned the vaccine's effectiveness in preventing Ebola contractions in a study sponsored by the National Institutes of Health, the Food and Drug Administration and the U.S. Department of Health and Human Services. The panel argued that the methodology of the patient trail was flawed, and concluded that while the vaccine may provide some protection, it could be lower than officially announced.

=== Oxfam ===
Oxfam announced in November that it has scaled up its response to £30 million, working in Sierra Leone and Liberia to develop new healthcare facilities, improve access to clean water and toilets, as increase awareness. The objective is to improve the quality and quantity of health care facilities, and stop the chain of infection by creating hygienic communities who understand how to minimise and eradicate onwards infection.

=== HealthMap ===
HealthMap, part of Boston Children's Hospital Informatics Group, was able to detect the first signs of hemorrhagic fever, subsequently identified as Ebola, in Guinea on March 14, 2014, through a digital disease detection software algorithm which monitors online news and social media. As the outbreak expanded, a designated site was created to present a centralized source of data regarding situational context and disease spread. The Ebola timeline website, which represents the highlights of over 10,000 unique news articles coming into the HealthMap database, is updated in real-time. The outbreak timeline website provides a centralized source of official, media, and 'innovative' information on the 2014 West African EVD outbreak. This tool may help to inform the general public and communicate outbreak response methods and protocols. The timeline website's goal is to provide fact- and science-based information to as broad an audience as possible.

=== EbolaData.org ===
At the Ebola Open Data Jam held on 18 October 2014, a group of volunteers initiated an open data repository, EbolaData.org, containing the wide variety of data sources related to the Ebola response that are publicly available. Data-driven decision making and planning, which is enabled by this repository, has much promise for effectively responding to the EVD epidemic. EbolaData.org is curated by the Thomas J. Watson Research Center.

=== International Mutual Aid ===
International Mutual Aid is a US-based 501 (c) (3) nonprofit, conducting Ebola treatment, surveillance, contact tracing, and case investigation in Kono District, Sierra Leone, during the epidemic.

== Companies and individual contributors ==
Response from big business has played a significant role when trying to stop the virus in Western Africa. Facebook founder Mark Zuckerberg and his wife Priscilla Chan have announced a donation of $25 million to the CDC Foundation to fight the Ebola crisis. The containment of the disease was partly due to the commitment of Oleg Deripaska, the founder of the second-largest aluminium producers RUSAL, that has been working in Guinea for almost 20 years. He mobilized all available resources to halt the spread of the virus and assisted medical institutions and helped isolate the sick. He invested over $10 million in the construction of the clinical and diagnostic research centre of epidemiology and microbiology in Kindia. Vaccine trials later took place at this center. This substantial investment in the construction of the center and the development of additional medical infrastructure had helped to stop the epidemic when the national's healthcare system was not prepared for it. Saudi King Abdullah has donated $35 million to the Islamic Development Bank to support its Ebola fighting programme, funding equipment and treatment centres in four West African countries. On 14 August, the Nigerian government said Aliko Dangote had donated $1 million to halt the spread of the Ebola virus outbreak. On 29 October a South African businessman, Patrice Motsepe, donated $1 million on behalf of the Motsepe Foundation and African Rainbow Minerals to Guinea to help fight the disease.

A lot of international companies donated substantial amounts of money (over $50 million by May 2014) and medical equipment to help fight the Ebola disease. To name a few Google donated up to $17.5 million; IKEA Foundation pledged over $6 million to Médecins Sans Frontières; Volvo Group donated $1,5 million to the United Nations Ebola Response Fund; Samsung provided 3,000 smartphones (approximately $1 million) to the United Nations Office for the Coordination of Humanitarian Affairs; Johnson & Johnson committed $1 million to the Centers for Disease Control Foundation and other NGOs; the Bridgestone Group pledged $1 million. Among the commercial organizations that sponsored WHO or offered donations to combat the Ebola virus, there also were FedEx ($620k); UPS ($500k); American Express ($200k); Xerox Foundation ($100k); Vale International Holdings GmbH ($100k); Société des Mines de Fer de Guinée ($25k); Société Anglogold Ashanti de Guinée ($25k) and others.~~.~~ In spring 2014 McKesson Account Manager Toby Capps donated 200 pallets of basic protection for under-equipped health centers in Sierra Leone, which were enough to meet needs for five months.

== Related Articles ==
African Responses to Ebola Outbreak
