= Hurricane Maria death toll controversy =

Disagreement on Hurricane Maria's death toll in Puerto Rico

Infrared satellite animation of Hurricane Maria making landfall in Puerto Rico on September 20

Hurricane Maria struck Puerto Rico as a high-end Category 4 hurricane on September 20, 2017, resulting in the island's most severe natural disaster in modern history. The entire island suffered devastating effects with the whole population losing access to electricity, the majority losing access to clean water, tens of thousands of homes destroyed, and road infrastructure left crippled. A series of cascading infrastructure failures compounded the direct effects of the hurricane. Lack of aid, electricity, water, and access to medical care endangered many people; elderly and poor residents were most impacted.

Despite the severity of these impacts, the Government of Puerto Rico initially reported that only 64 people died in the hurricane. Numerous media outlets harshly criticized the government for suppressing the true death toll. Investigative reporting corroborated these accusations, with The New York Times finding upwards of 1,000 potentially hurricane-related fatalities in the months following Maria. In response to mounting accusations of a cover-up, the government ordered an independent investigation and on December 18, 2017, contracted a study of the death toll by the Milken Institute School of Public Health.

In February 2018, CNN and Puerto Rico's Center for Investigative Journalism filed three lawsuits against the Government of Puerto Rico to obtain details on deaths in the months following Maria. Following a court ruling, the government released the withheld information. Statistical data showed an increase of 1,427 deaths in 2017 as compared to the preceding four years; however, the number attributable to Maria could not be determined. On August 28, the Government of Puerto Rico revised the official death toll to be 2,975 people, ranking Maria as one of the deadliest hurricanes in United States history. The official estimate is based on a study commissioned by the governor of Puerto Rico, where researchers at George Washington University developed statistical models showing the number of excess deaths for the time period between September 2017 and February 2018 to be between 2,658 and 3,290 (with a 95 percent confidence interval). Researchers attributed the low initially reported death count to "lack of awareness of appropriate death certification practices after a natural disaster" among physicians reporting deaths to vital statistic agencies.

== Background ==
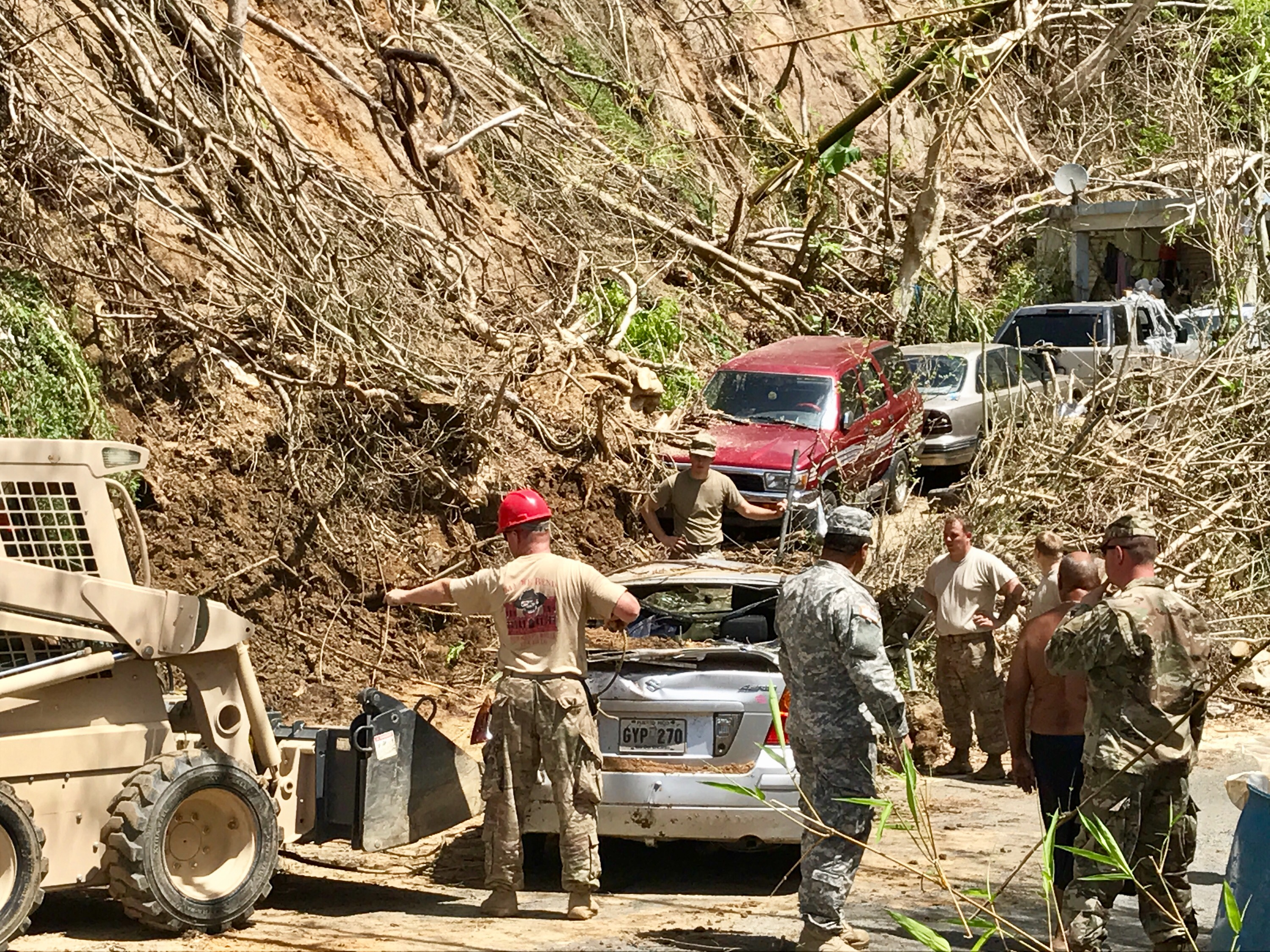
Downed trees, power lines, and landslides clogged countless roads across the island, leaving numerous communities completely isolated. Relief aid was unable to reach many towns for days or weeks after the hurricane struck.

In the decade preceding Maria, Puerto Rico suffered from major financial decline and crippling debt from a combination of poor fiscal management and changes in federal tax policy. In early 2017, the territory filed for bankruptcy as its public debt reached $74 billion. A change in federal taxation policy prompted an exodus of lucrative business and reduced tax revenue; poverty rates reached 45 percent. Aging infrastructure across the island makes the electrical grid more susceptible to damage from storms; the median age of Puerto Rico Electric Power Authority (PREPA) power plants is 44 years. Inadequate safety also plagues the company, and local newspapers frequently describe poor maintenance and outdated controls. PREPA struggled with increasing debt, reaching $9 billion before the hurricanes prompting them to file for bankruptcy. Furthermore, the company reduced its staffing by 30 percent since 2012. Alongside being outdated, the electrical infrastructure was built largely above ground and exposed to the direct effects of hurricanes.

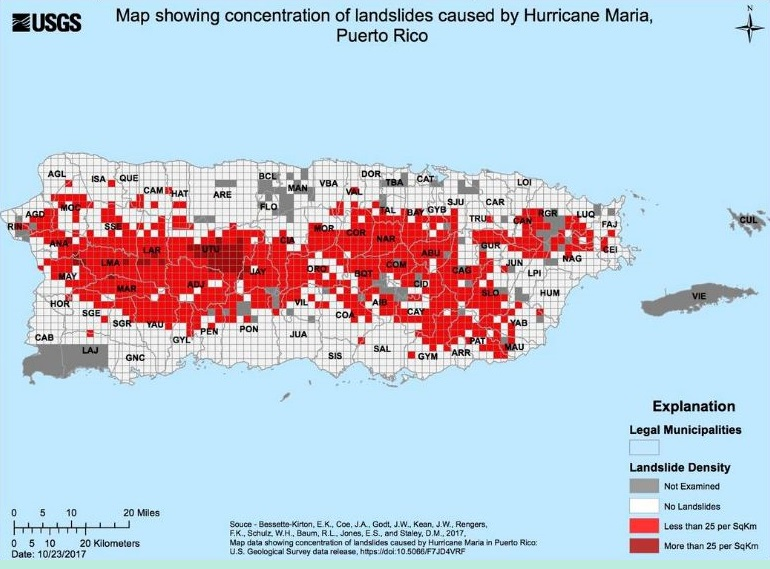
Much of the island suffered landslides

The 2017 Atlantic hurricane season produced multiple powerful and long-lived tropical cyclones. August and September proved to be especially active, featuring three catastrophic hurricanes: Harvey, Irma, and Maria. Timothy Gallaudet, acting director of the National Oceanic and Atmospheric Administration, described it as "a season that wouldn't quit". In early September, Irma devastated the Leeward Islands as a Category 5 hurricane and tracked close to Puerto Rico. Although the center remained well offshore, tropical storm-force winds affected the territory and caused substantial damage. The storm weakened the already embattled power grid, and left it susceptible to complete failure. While recovery efforts remained underway in Texas and Florida for Harvey and Irma, respectively, Maria struck Puerto Rico on September 20 as a high-end Category 4 hurricane. The hurricane inflicted catastrophic damage island-wide, decimating the power grid, crippling road infrastructure, and leaving the majority of people without access to clean water.

The Federal Emergency Management Agency had little time to prepare and respond, and had shipped out many of the supplies it had stored on Puerto Rico to assist recovery from Irma in the US Virgin Islands. The agency admitted logistical failures, personnel shortages, and communication troubles with the local government vastly hampered their ability to assist in recovery. Inland communities remained isolated for days after the storm struck, leaving the territory's poor and elderly especially vulnerable. Injured persons or those in need of regular medical care (such as dialysis) were unable to access emergency services for prolonged periods of time. Food and water shortages exacerbated the risk of death, especially in inland communities.

== Initial criticisms ==
In the months following Maria, the official death toll relayed from the Government of Puerto Rico came into question by media outlets, politicians, and investigative journalists. Scores of people who survived the hurricane's initial onslaught later died from complications in its aftermath. Catastrophic damage to infrastructure and communication hampered efforts to accurately document the total loss of life. An electronic database system for reporting deaths was not in existence at the time of the hurricane and most of the internet and communication systems were destroyed. In 2018 a judge ruled that a database should be created and made public with death records. In the governor's published recovery report in 2018, titled Transformation and Innovation in the Wake of Devastation, then governor Rosselló proposed creating a new national electronic reporting system that would hopefully improve accuracy in death reporting after a natural disaster. such as Hurricane Maria.

In Corozal, the government listed no fatalities; however, the mayor of the town, Sergio Torres Torres disputed this claim saying he knew for a fact that deaths had occurred. Deaths related to power outages at Manatí Medical Center were not sent to San Juan for examination according to executive director José S. Rosado. He asserted heart attacks as natural causes; however, this is in direct contrast to government definitions, which include heart attacks as hurricane-related causes.

In an October 12, 2017 public letter to the Department of Homeland Security, Representatives Nydia Velázquez and Bennie Thompson complained that the death toll was underreported, either intentionally "to portray relief efforts as more successful than they are", or "due to a lack of capacity on the island", and requested that DHS immediately evaluate the accuracy and methodology of the enumeration. In contrast, Mónica Menéndez—deputy director of the Bureau of Forensic Sciences—called the claims of hundreds of fatalities incorrect and dismissed them as "rumors". Secretary of Public Safety Héctor M. Pesquera called claims of meddling with the death toll "horseshit". In CNN's report, they indicate that at least part of the issue is also related to subjectivity on what counts as a hurricane-related death.

== Government records and handling ==
=== Initial reports ===
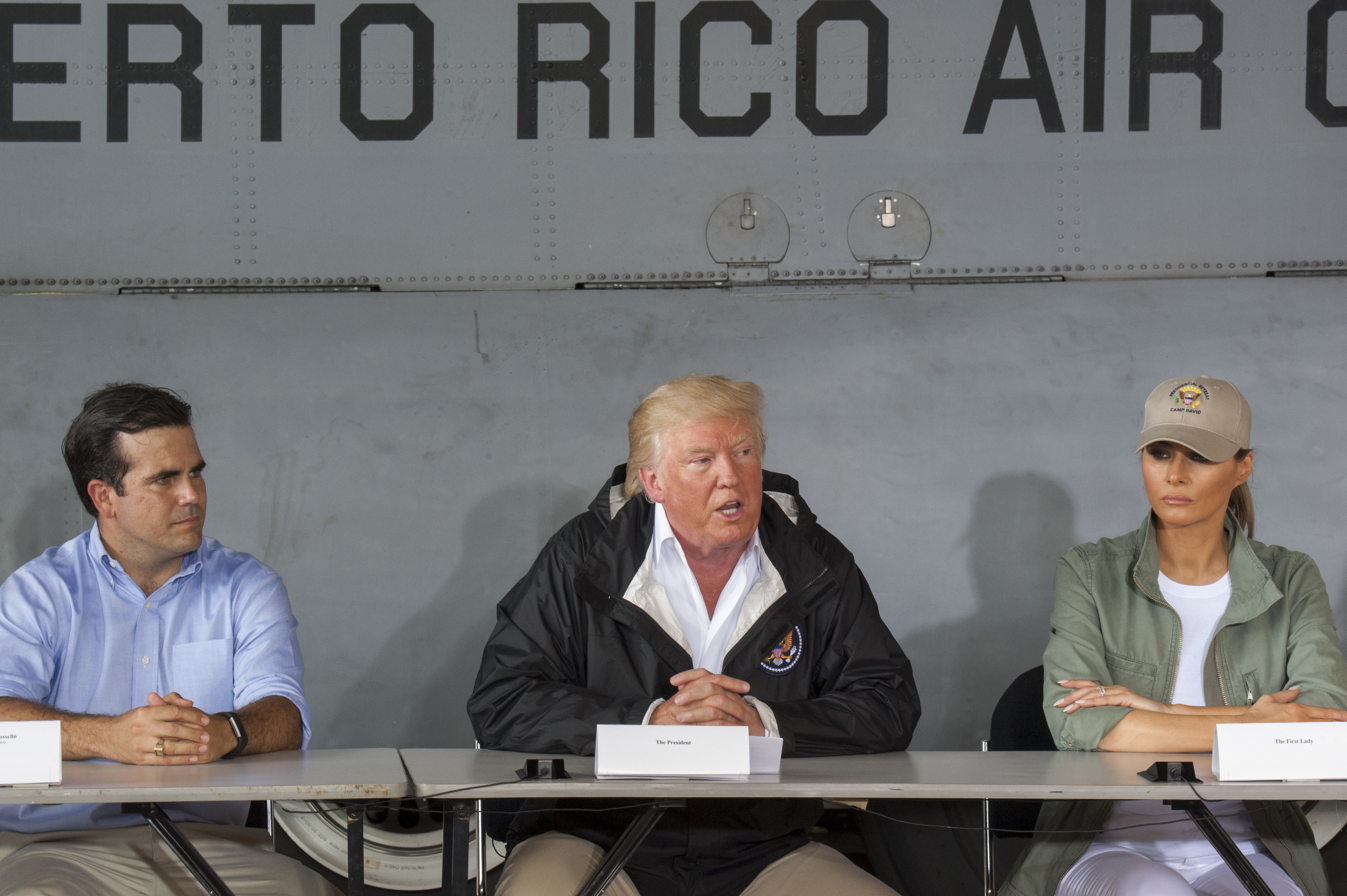
Governor Ricardo Rosselló with President Donald Trump and First Lady Melania Trump following Hurricane Maria in 2017

During a press conference on October 3, 2017, President Donald Trump applauded the initial low death toll—at the time the government only certified 16 deaths—and claimed it was nothing like "a real catastrophe like [Hurricane] Katrina" in 2005 with thousands dead. San Juan Mayor Yulín Cruz harshly criticized Trump as "killing [Puerto Ricans] with the inefficiency [of relief efforts]." Following the visit by Trump, concerns over political motivations in the handling of relief efforts surged. The magnitude of devastation proved to be an unprecedented challenge for relief efforts by the Army Corps of Engineers and FEMA. Senator Kamala Harris claimed that "the government failed Puerto Rico at every level in the wake of Hurricane Maria".

Between September 20 and October 18, the island's only medical examiner authorized 911 bodies for cremation; however, they were not physically examined and simply given "natural causes" as the cause of death. Official statistics showed increases of about 20% and 27% in overall fatalities in Puerto Rico during September 2017, compared to 2016 and 2015, followed by a decrease of about 10% in October 2017 compared to the previous two Octobers.

On November 3, San Juan Mayor Yulín Cruz said that the actual death toll for Puerto Rico may have been as high as 500, which was more than 10 times higher than the official death toll as of early November 2017.

By the end of November, the Puerto Rican government maintained that their report of 55 fatalities was the most accurate despite ample contrary evidence collected by media and investigative journalists. On December 9, the official death toll reported by the government was 64; this count remained unchanged six months later. According to Governor Ricardo Rosselló, the government maintained the death toll at 64 in accordance with Centers for Disease Control protocols.

Through at least June 2018, hundreds of unclaimed bodies remained in morgues, and the island's primary morgue was "overflowing" with them. A total of 307 bodies were stored at the San Juan morgue and four refrigerators in a nearby lot. Staff shortages resulting from budget cuts further complicated the situation as bodies were unable to be processed in a timely fashion.

=== 2018 lawsuits and corrections ===
Deadliest United States hurricanes
Rank	Hurricane	Season	Fatalities
1	4 "Galveston"	1900	8,000–12,000
2	4 "San Ciriaco"	1899	3,400
3	5 Maria	2017	2,982
4	5 "Okeechobee"	1928	2,823
5	4 "Cheniere Caminada"	1893	2,000
6	5 Katrina	2005	1,392
7	3 "Sea Islands"	1893	1,000–2,000
8	3 "Indianola"	1875	771
9	4 "Florida Keys"	1919	745
10	2 "Georgia"	1881	700
Reference: NOAA, GWU (Note: The storm category color indicates the intensity of the hurricane when landfalling in the U.S.)

In light of mounting evidence contradicting the official government death toll and allegations of a cover-up, CNN and Puerto Rico's Center for Investigative Journalism filed three lawsuits against the Government of Puerto Rico in February 2018. The lawsuits requested the government to release "death certificates and related data". During court hearings, the government argued that at least some information should be withheld over privacy concerns for the dead. On June 4, Superior Court Judge Lauracelis Roques Arroyo ruled the requested information to be public record and ordered the data to be published within a week. The government filed a motion to delay the release of these records on June 12, citing more time was needed to compile the information due to limited staff and budgeting. However, the court rejected the motion and maintained the original release date. Accordingly, the Government of Puerto Rico released updated death statistics for the months following Hurricane Maria on June 13. Compared to the average deaths in September to December 2013 – 2016, September to December 2017 had 1,427 excess deaths; however, it is unknown how many of these deaths are attributable to the hurricane. Furthermore, the government acknowledged the death toll was greater than 64 but an official revision would not be made until the results of George Washington University study were published.

On August 9, a draft of a $139 billion funding request to Congress was reported on by The New York Times. A passage in the document read: "According to initial reports, 64 lives were lost. That estimate was later revised to 1,427." The government noted that a series of "cascading failures" led to the multitude of deaths. The combined effects of Irma in early September and Maria left the entire island without power, the majority without access to clean water, and crippled road infrastructure. The territory's elderly population became especially susceptible to illness and many died as they were unable to receive medical care. In response to the widespread media publication of this, Héctor Pesquera stated "This is not the official number of deaths attributable to Hurricane Maria." He reiterated that the official toll would not be changed until the release of the George Washington University study. Accordingly, the document in question was adjusted to remove mention of 1,427 deaths.

Journalists from the Associated Press, Quartz and the Center for Investigative Journalism are documenting the deaths in a database and tips can be sent in.

=== Official revision, August 2018 ===
On August 28, 2018, Governor Rosselló acknowledged the results of the George Washington University study and revised the island's official death toll to 2,975 people. Rosselló described the effects of the hurricane as "unprecedented devastation". The governor apologized for mistakes made under his leadership but denied the widespread claims of his actions being politically motivated. He signed an executive order to establish a commission to determine how to implement the recommendations for improving communications and the death certification process. Furthermore, a memorial was to be established in honor of the victims.

=== President Trump's response, September 2018 ===
3000 people did not die in the two hurricanes that hit Puerto Rico. When I left the Island, AFTER the storm had hit, they had anywhere from 6 to 18 deaths. As time went by it did not go up by much. Then, a long time later, they started to report really large numbers, like 3000

This was done by the Democrats in order to make me look as bad as possible when I was successfully raising Billions of Dollars to help rebuild Puerto Rico. If a person died for any reason, like old age, just add them onto the list. Bad politics. I love Puerto Rico!

— President Donald Trump, September 13, 2018

On September 13, 2018 President Trump began tweeting about the results of the GWU study and his administration's response to the disaster. He called the recovery efforts "an incredible, unsung success" despite widespread condemnation of its inadequacy. He claimed "3000 people did not die in the two hurricanes that hit Puerto Rico"—referring to Irma and Maria, and that these reports of large numbers of deaths were caused by "bad politics" pushed by Democrats to smear his image. Described as a conspiracy theory by media outlets, Trump made these accusations without evidence.

On September 14, Trump again disputed the accuracy of the official death toll, describing that the GWU study used an unprecedented and unproven method which created the numbers "like magic", and questioning how the government of Puerto Rico wouldn't actually know how many people died prior to the GWU study. On this date, a poll of 1,000 Americans by HuffPost and YouGov found that 43% believe that there were nearly 3,000 deaths, while 24% believe that the actual number of deaths were "much fewer". Of Trump voters, around 10% believe that there were nearly 3,000 deaths, while around 63% believe that the actual number of deaths were "much fewer".

The unsupported accusations by Trump received widespread condemnation from both Democrats and Republicans, with Democrats voicing the most significant criticism. Representative Ileana Ros-Lehtinen (R-FL) called his claims "shameless and disgusting". Former Homeland Security Advisor Tom Bossert stated Trump lacked empathy in his response to the disaster. New York Democratic Congressional candidate Alexandria Ocasio-Cortez expressed ire as her grandfather was among the uncounted victims in the hurricane's aftermath. San Juan Mayor Carmen Yulín Cruz, who previously confronted Trump numerous times on Twitter in the hurricane's wake, provided the harshest criticism, calling Trump "delusional, paranoid, and unhinged from any sense of reality". Governor Rosselló offered to "walk [Trump] through the scientific process of the study" and requested that the President show empathy and respect for the victims. The Milken Institute School of Public Health reaffirmed the results of their study. Multiple Republican politicians from Florida denied Trump's claims, including Senator Marco Rubio, Governor Rick Scott, and former Representative Ron DeSantis. Speaker of the House Paul Ryan stated he "[had] no reason to dispute those numbers". However, he did not implicate the Trump Administration as a reason for the multitude of deaths.

== Journalist investigations ==
On October 11, 2017, Vox reported 81 deaths directly or indirectly related to the hurricane, with another 450 deaths awaiting investigation. Furthermore, they indicated 69 people were missing. On October 14, CNN reported the number of missing people to be about 117.

A two-week investigation in November 2017 by CNN of 112 funeral homes—approximately half of the island—revealed 499 hurricane-related deaths between September 20 and October 19. Funeral homes became so overwhelmed by the number of bodies that in one instance a facility's director in Vega Alta died from a heart attack. The George Washington University study determined that this heart attack was directly caused by the number of bodies at the facility. Eric Klinenberg, director of New York University's Institute for Public Knowledge, cautioned that the deaths tallied through just funeral homes would still be below the actual death toll as many victims would simply not be sent to such facilities for processing. Comparing average monthly deaths to the reported deaths in 2017, The New York Times calculated an increase of 1,052 fatalities in the 42 days following Maria compared to previous years. Significant spikes in causes of deaths compared to the two preceding Septembers included sepsis (+47%), pneumonia (+45%), emphysema (+43%), diabetes (+31%), and Alzheimer's and Parkinson's (+23%). Robert Anderson at the National Center for Health Statistics conveyed the increase in monthly fatalities was statistically significant and likely driven in some capacity by Hurricane Maria.

== University studies estimating "excess deaths" ==
COUNT Victims Act
- Long title: Counting Our Unexpected Natural Tragedies' Victims Act
- Announced in: the 115th United States Congress
- Sponsored by: Kamala Harris (D‑CA)
- Number of co-sponsors: 7 when introduced

Legislative history
- Introduced in the Senate as S. 3033 by Kamala Harris (D‑CA) on June 7, 2018; Committee consideration by Homeland Security and Governmental Affairs

Two scientists at Penn State University, Alexis Santos and Jeffrey Howard, estimated the death toll in Puerto Rico to be 1,085 by the end of November 2017. They utilized average monthly deaths and the spike in fatalities following the hurricane. The value only accounted for reported deaths, and with limitations to communication, the actual toll could have been even higher.

A study led by Caroline Buckee and her colleagues at the Harvard T.H. Chan School of Public Health, published on May 29, 2018, found 14.3 excess deaths per 1,000 people in the four months after the hurricane. The results showed 4,645 excess deaths during this period, a 62 percent increase over 2016. This was calculated through interviews with 3,299 households. Accounting for single-person homes where a fatality occurred, which could not be interviewed, the authors concluded overall excess deaths to be 5,740. Extrapolating the results to the entire population of Puerto Rico would suggest that between 793 and 8,498 excess deaths (with a 95 percent confidence interval) occurred in the aftermath of the hurricane. The Harvard study received criticism over the large range of its results, and The Washington Post criticized media outlets for not conveying the uncertainties in the study appropriately. Donald Berry at the University of Texas MD Anderson Cancer Center stated, "The results are statistically weak and nearly useless, at least insofar as number of deaths is concerned ... The error is almost as big as the estimate." Steven Kopits of Princeton Policy Advisers conveyed that if the study were to be believed, approximately 3,000 bodies would be missing whereas only 45 people were reported missing by the end of December 2017.

Senator Kamala Harris, backed by several other Democratic senators, sponsored the Counting Our Unexpected Natural Tragedies' Victims Act (COUNT Victims Act, S. 3033) on June 7 to fund a $2 million study by FEMA through the National Academy of Medicine in order to determine the best way to tabulate deaths from future disasters. The proposed bill would require results to be completed and published by 2020. Harris emphasized the necessity of the act: "We cannot allow our government's failed response in Puerto Rico to ever happen again."

=== George Washington University study ===
On December 18, 2017, Governor Rosselló ordered a recount and new analysis of the official death toll. The task of reviewing the death toll was given to the Milken Institute School of Public Health at George Washington University (GWU), with some assistance from the University of Puerto Rico, in February 2018. The goal of the report is to determine the number of excess deaths in the six months following the hurricane. This includes the number of directly- and indirectly-related fatalities. A draft report was to be released in May while the final, peer-reviewed study would be released in February 2019 alongside a review of how Puerto Rico's government handled the death toll. The first phase of the study is expected to cost $305,000 while the second phase, which would include specific case reviews, could cost up to $1.1 million. The Government of Puerto Rico is funding the first phase and the second phase will be funded through grants solicited by the University of Puerto Rico. The study saw delays in progress due to the volume of data to be processed and was released in August 2018.

On August 27, 2018, the university published its results, indicating that 2,658–3,290 excess deaths (with a 95 percent confidence interval) occurred between September 2017 and February 2018, primarily driven by the effects and aftermath of Hurricane Maria. The researchers supplied a value of 2,975 as the most-likely number of excess deaths. Dr. Lynn Goldman at the Milken Institute stated that further excess deaths continued to occur beyond February—namely among the poor and elderly—and continued study would be necessary to get a more complete picture of the loss of life. The immediate reasoning for the official death toll remaining at 64 for a prolonged period was pinned on lack of training for physicians in mortality protocol. These 64 fatalities occurred due to the direct results of Hurricane Maria, namely drowning and blunt-force trauma from collapsed buildings and airborne debris. Those charged with documentation of deaths stated that the Puerto Rico Department of Health and Puerto Rico Department of Public Safety did not inform them of Centers for Disease Control protocols.

Alongside determining the loss of life, the GWU study analyzed the government's activities and preparedness before, during, and after the storm. The results provided "blistering criticism" of Rosello and his government for inadequate preparedness and personnel training for crisis and emergency risk communication. The Department of Public Safety and Central Communications Office were found to not have written "crisis and emergency risk communication plans" established. The available response plan was severely outdated and only designed to handle a Category 1 hurricane, far weaker than the intensity of Maria. Limited communications compounded inadequate preparedness, particularly in poorer communities. Furthermore, a lack of communication personnel during the storm hampered attempts to remedy this. Interviews with government personnel identified deficient coordination between central, municipal, and federal agencies. Lack of timely dissemination of accurate information alongside the spread of rumors undermined public trust in and perceived transparency of the government.

=== University of Puerto Rico at Mayagüez ===
Two University of Puerto Rico at Mayagüez's researchers did a study on the number of Hurricane Maria deaths. Their results indicated the estimated number of deaths caused by Maria between September 20, 2017 and December 31, 2017 (reviewing two months less data than the GWU study had reviewed) to be between 1,069 and 1,568. Their research was published in the journal Statistics in Medicine on July 8, 2019. A judge had ordered that death records by made available and a database containing records of deaths since January 2017 has been publicly made available since mid 2018.
