= Marcel Salathé =

Swiss digital epidemiologist

Associate Professor Marcel Salathé
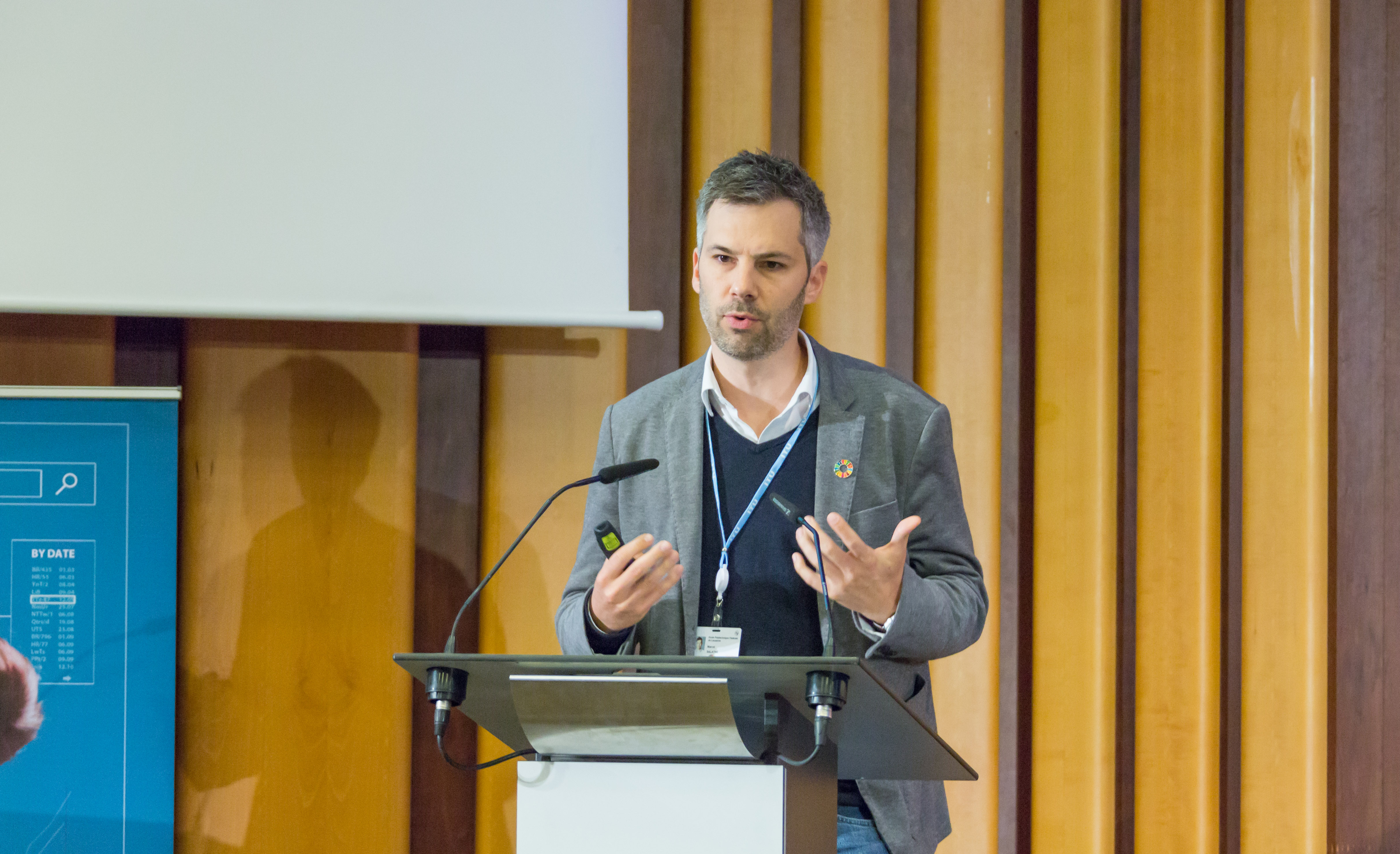
- Marcel Salathé at AI for Good Global Summit 2018
- Born: 1975 (age 50–51); Basel, Switzerland

Academic background
- Education: University of Basel; ETH Zurich
- Academic advisor: Sebastian Bonhoeffer

Academic work
- Discipline: Epidemiology
- Sub-discipline: Digital epidemiology
- Institutions: EPFL
- Main interests: Digital epidemiology Applied machine learning Health & disease Dynamic network analysis
- Website: www.epfl.ch/labs/salathelab/ digitalepidemiologylab.org

Marcel Salathé (born 1975 in Basel) is a Swiss digital epidemiologist and currently an associate professor at EPFL. He is the PI of the Lab of Digital Epidemiology, and co-director of the EPFL AI Center. In the first year of the COVID-19 pandemic, Salathé was the most quoted scientist in the Swiss media.

== Career ==
From 1995 to 2002, Salathé studied biology at the University of Basel. In 2007, he graduated in biology and environmental sciences at ETH Zurich with a PhD on population genetics and evolutionary biology in the group of Sebastian Bonhoeffer, where he thereafter pursued postdoctoral studies for one year. In 2008, Salathé was awarded with a Society in Science Branco Weiss fellowship. The same year he joined group of Marcus Feldman at Stanford University as a postdoctoral researcher. In 2010, he became assistant professor at the Center for Infectious Disease Dynamics at Pennsylvania State University.

In 2015, he was nominated associated professor at EPFL with a double appointment at School of Computer and Communication Sciences and the School of Life Sciences, where he acts as a founding director of the Lab of Digital Epidemiology. In 2016, he founded the EPFL Extension School, the EPFL online school for applied digital skills and has since served as its academic director.

In the course of the COVID-19 pandemic, Salathé became more widely known to a wider public mainly through multiple appearances in Swiss television and media outlets, and in public lectures. In November 2020, he was named director of the steering committee of the Swiss COVID-19 national research program.

== Research ==
Salathé is interested in epidemiological problems, especially in contact networks. He analyses digital data streams (e.g. Twitter or mobile phones) in order to gain epidemiological insights. He is the lead author of the paper Digital Epidemiology published in 2012 introducing the term digital epidemiology (e-epidemiology). In recent years, his research began to focus on nutritional epidemiology, using digital and AI-based tools to enable high-resolution food tracking in medical cohorts.

Since the COVID-19 pandemic, his work focused also on digital contact tracing. He has been a member the group developing the Decentralized Privacy-Preserving Proximity Tracing algorithm, and the scientific lead behind the SwissCovid mobile phone application released by the Federal administration of Switzerland. The latter is the first digital contact tracing application developed by a government that is based on the Google's and Apple's Exposure Notifications System.

Salathé is a co-founder of CH++, a political action group for science-based policy development.

== Distinctions ==
From 2008 to 2013, Salathé was a Branco Weiss Society in Science Fellow and in 2018 and again in 2020, he was nominated Switzerland Digital Shaper.

Since 2020 he has been a member of the Swiss National COVID-19 Science Task Force, the scientific corona advisory board of the Federal Council and the cantons. He chairs the expert group on Digital Epidemiology. In November 2020, Salathé was appointed as the president of the SNSF steering committee for the national research programme "Covid-19".

He is co-founder of the startup AIcrowd that maintains a collaboration platform for data scientists specialized in crowdsourcing AI solutions.

== Publications ==
- Mohanty, S.P., Hughes, D.P. and Salathé, M., 2016. Using deep learning for image-based plant disease detection. Frontiers in plant science, 7, p. 1419.
- Salathé, M., Kazandjieva, M., Lee, J.W., Levis, P., Feldman, M.W. and Jones, J.H., 2010. A high-resolution human contact network for infectious disease transmission. Proceedings of the National Academy of Sciences, 107(51), pp. 22020-22025.
- Salathé, M. and Khandelwal, S., 2011. Assessing vaccination sentiments with online social media: implications for infectious disease dynamics and control. PLoS Comput Biol, 7(10), p.e1002199.
- Marcel Salathé, Christian L Althaus, Nanina Anderegg, Daniele Antonioli, Tala Ballouz, Edouard Bugnion, Srjan Capkun, Dennis Jackson, Sang-Il Kim, James Larus, View ORCID ProfileNicola Low, Wouter Lueks, Dominik Menges, Cedric Moullet, Mathias Payer, Julien Riou, Theresa Stadler, Carmela Troncoso, Effy Vayena, Viktor von Wyl, 2020. Early Evidence of Effectiveness of Digital Contact Tracing for SARS-CoV-2 in Switzerland. MedRXiv.
- Marcel Salathé: Kompass Künstliche Intelligenz. Ein Reiseführer durch eine Welt in verrückten Zeiten. Wörterseh, 2025, ISBN 978-3-03763-168-3.

== See also ==
- COVID-19 pandemic in Switzerland
