= John Brownstein =

Canadian epidemiologist

- Born: John S. Brownstein; Montreal, Quebec, Canada
- Education: McGill University
- Awards: Presidential Early Career Award for Scientists and Engineers, 2010
- Scientific career
- Fields: Epidemiology Informatics
- Workplaces: Harvard Medical School Boston Children's Hospital
- Website: compepi.org

John Brownstein is a Canadian epidemiologist and Professor of Medicine at the Harvard Medical School as well as the Chief Innovation Officer at Boston Children's Hospital. His research focuses on development of computational methods in epidemiology for applications to public health also known as computational epidemiology or e-epidemiology He is also the founder of several global public health surveillance systems including HealthMap. He is most known for his work on global tracking of disease outbreaks.

== Early life and education ==
Brownstein is the son of Veronica (Coleman) and Stephen Brownstein, and his sister is Jessica Mulroney. He is a descendant of the founders of Browns Shoes. He grew up in Montreal and obtained his bachelor's degree in biology from the McGill University in 1999. He received a Ph.D. in epidemiology in 2004 from Yale University for work on the emergence of Lyme disease and West Nile virus in the United States.

== Career and research ==
Brownstein joined the faculty at Harvard Medical School and Boston Children's Hospital in 2005, where he focused on the intersection of epidemiology and computer science. He directs the Computational Epidemiology Group at Boston Children's Hospital and the Innovation and Digital Health Accelerator also at Boston Children. He was appointed as full Professor of Pediatrics and Biomedical Informatics at Harvard Medical School in 2015; tenured at age 36, he was one of the youngest professors to receive tenure in the modern history of Harvard Medical School. He received the Presidential Early Career Award for Scientists and Engineers in 2010 and the Lagrange Prize in 2016. He was honored with the 40 under 40 award by Boston Business Journal in 2015 and by Medtech Boston in 2016.

Brownstein's pioneered the creation of Computational epidemiology and E-epidemiology- utilizing diverse digital data sources to understand populations. He has published 200 peer-reviewed papers, all focused on new methods and applications in public health surveillance. Overall, his research agenda aims to facilitate the control and prevention of disease through better epidemiologic understanding of factors influencing disease risk, improved practice of public health and engaging the public around critical health issues. As part of this work, he has built and maintains several patient facing public health systems, including HealthMap, an internet-based global infectious disease intelligence system.

During the H1N1 pandemic, his research made important contributions to our understanding of the emergence of the virus in Mexico and its subsequent global spread.

His work is credited with supporting early detection and surveillance of Cholera in 2010, Ebola in 2014, Zika in 2015. His work has led to the application of crowdsourcing in health; a field termed "participatory epidemiology". . His work has been funded from diverse array of sources including The U.S. Department of Defense, Google.org and the National Institutes of Health (NIH). Along with Sachin H. Jain he coined the term "Digital Phenotype" in a seminal paper in Nature Biotechnology.

On December 30, 2019, the HealthMap system led by Brownstein was the first electronic disease surveillance program to issue an alert for an unknown pneumonia in Wuhan, China. Following identification of the SARS-CoV-2 virus and COVID-19 disease, Brownstein coauthored numerous papers on nopharmaceutical interventions, socioeconomic disparities, and participatory surveillance related to the global pandemic. Brownstein also coauthored a controversial paper that analyzed satellite image data and search engine traffic data and speculated that COVID-May 19 have started as early as Fall 2019 in Wuhan. This claim received widespread media coverage including reports and an academic commentary that questioned the academic rigour of the study. Brownstein also published one of the first empirical manuscripts that showed the usage of face masks were effective at decreasing the spread of SARS-CoV-2 in the U.S. population.

=== Vaccines.gov ===
In 2009, in response to the H1N1 pandemic, Google.org launched a web application to help people find their closest vaccination site. The free portal partnered with pharmacy chains and vaccine providers to provide real-time availability of seasonal influenza and H1N1 vaccinations. In 2012, this vaccine-finding system merged with the Healthmap team to become VaccineFinder.org where, under Brownstein's leadership, it would expand to include a more diverse selection of vaccines and providers. During the COVID-19 pandemic, the system would expand further to include all US providers of the SARS-CoV-2 vaccine. In partnership with the Centers for Disease Control and Prevention and the US Department of Health and Human Services, Brownstein's team transitioned VaccineFinder to power the newly announced US government SARS-CoV-2 vaccine-finding website, Vaccines.gov. The revamped and rebranded website included a Spanish mirror site (Vacunas.gov), a 24/7 hotline and text-messaging assistance service.

=== Other Efforts ===
Brownstein is co-founder of Epidemico a commercial spinoff of Boston Children's Hospital that was acquired by Booz Allen Hamilton in 2014.

He is also the official advisor to Uber on healthcare applications where he started the UberHealth initiative. From that work, he founded the company Circulation which was acquired by Logisticare in 2018.

He joined ABC News as a Medical Contributor as part of their COVID-19 pandemic coverage. He won an Emmy as part of the team behind the ABC special The Shot: Race for the Vaccine, a documentary on the making of the COVID vaccine.
