= Sebastian Bonhoeffer =

German biologist

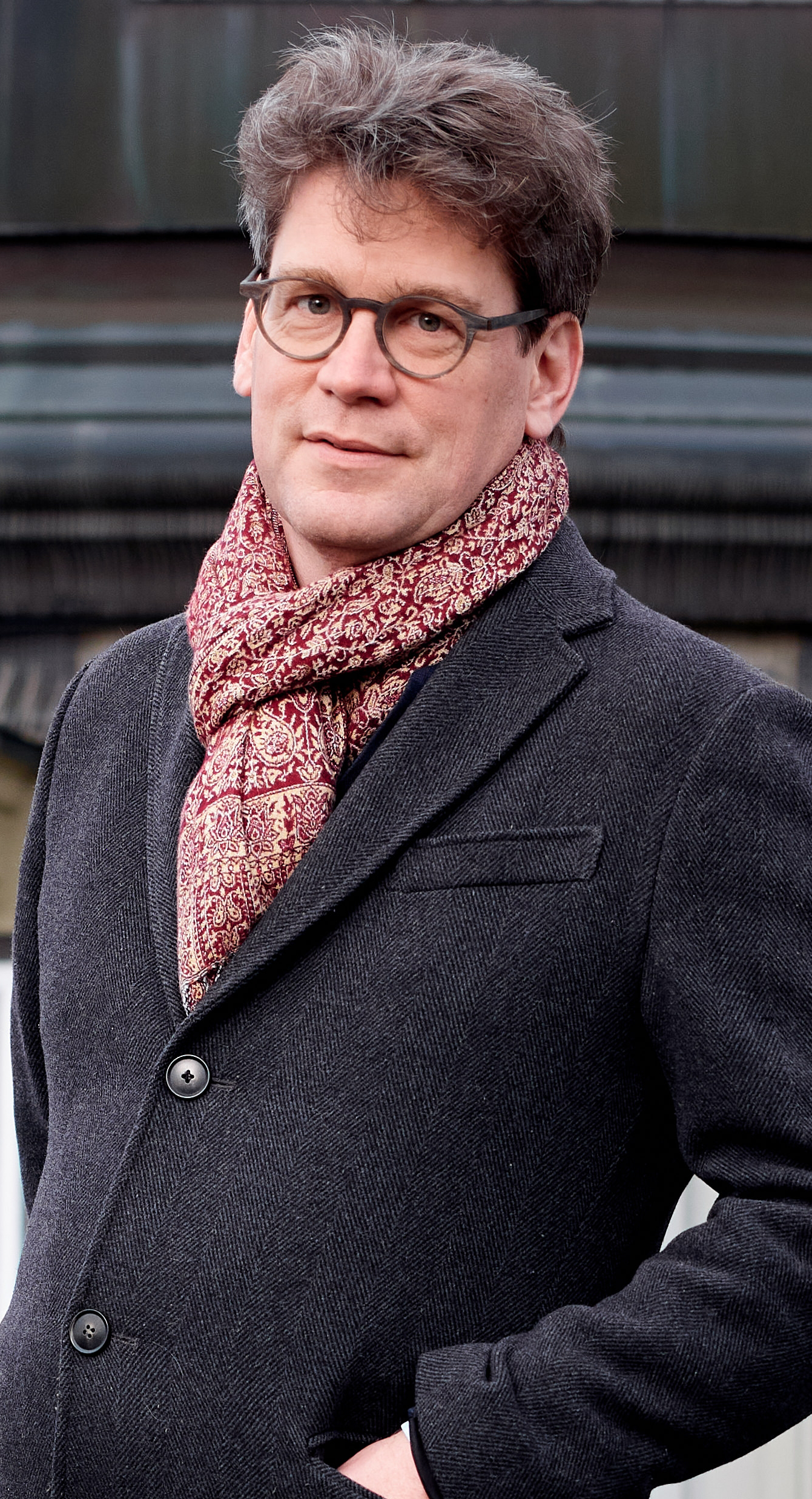
Sebastian Bonhoeffer (2020)

Sebastian Bonhoeffer (born 1965 in Tübingen, Germany) is a German biologist at the ETH Zürich and Director of the Collegium Helveticum.

== Life and works ==
Bonhoeffer studied cello in Basel under Heinrich Schiff and physics in Munich and Vienna. In 1995, he did his doctorate with Martin A. Nowak under Robert May at the Institute of Zoology at the University of Oxford on the population dynamics and evolution of viral diseases. He worked as a postdoctoral fellow at the University of Oxford and Rockefeller University. In 1998, he was appointed junior group leader at the Friedrich Miescher Institute for Biomedical Research in Basel. In 2001, Sebastian Bonhoeffer was awarded a research professorship by the Swiss National Science Foundation at ETH Zurich. He has been Professor of Theoretical Biology at the Department of Environmental Systems Science and since 2005 and serves as Director of the Collegium Helveticum since 2020.

Sebastian Bonhoeffer's research concerns the evolution and population biology of bacteria and viruses. He develops and analyses mathematical and computational models for the dynamics of infectious diseases. For example, he developed population-dynamic models of viral infections, which allowed important insights into pathogenesis and treatment of HIV infection. More recent work deals with the development and spread of antibiotic resistance. Group alumni include Tanja Stadler, Martin Ackermann, and Marcel Salathé.

Sebastian Bonhoeffer is an elected member of the European Molecular Biology Organization and international honorary member of the American Academy of Arts and Sciences.

Sebastian Bonhoeffer is married to musician Hanna Weinmeister and they have two children.
