= Beth Altringer =

Product Designer and Lecturer

Beth Ames Altringer
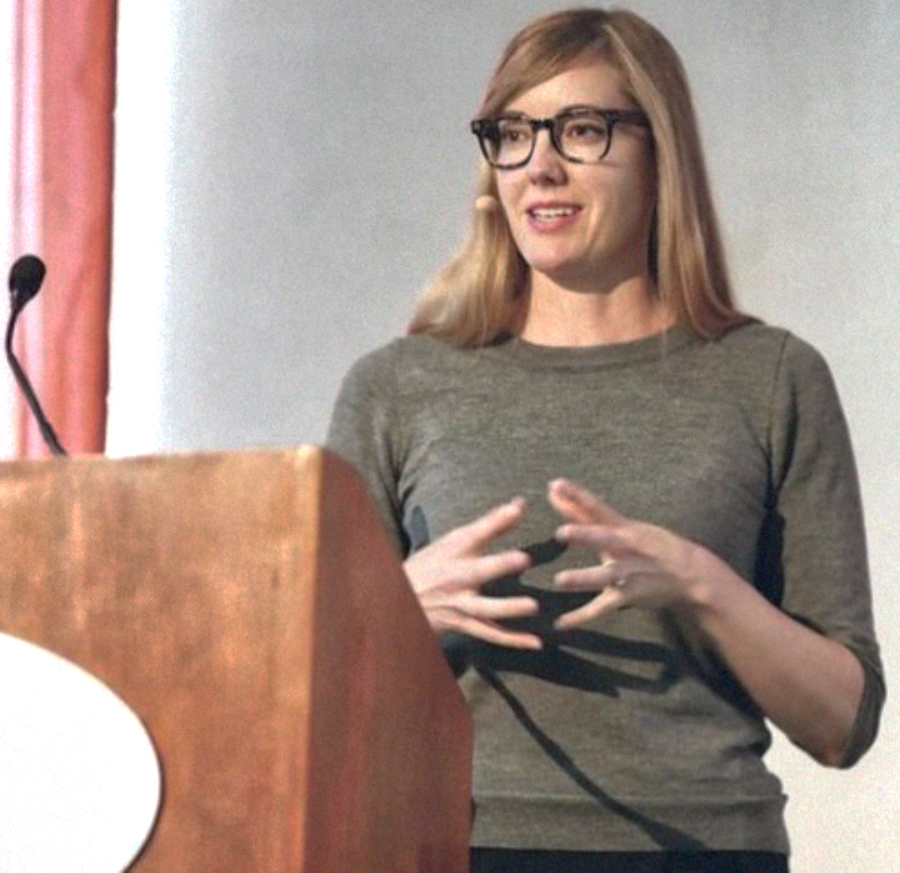
- Education: University of Cambridge; University of Cape Town; Pontifical Catholic University of Chile; Barrett, The Honors College
- Known for: User-centered design Design education
- Spouse: Nathan Eagle
- Scientific career
- Fields: User-centered design
- Workplaces: Harvard University; Massachusetts Institute of Technology; Stanford University; Brown University; RISD
- Doctoral advisor: Mark de Rond

Beth Ames Altringer is an American designer and academic in user-centered design and design education. She is the director of the Master of Arts in Design Engineering program at Brown University and the Rhode Island School of Design. Altringer previously ran the Design Lab at Harvard University and taught design and innovation at the Harvard John A. Paulson School of Engineering and Applied Sciences, Harvard Graduate School of Design, and Harvard Business School.

== Education ==
Altringer earned a Master's degree in Architecture from the University of Cape Town and a PhD in the psychology of design from the University of Cambridge at Emmanuel College. During a visiting scholarship at Stanford University's Computer Science Department in human-computer interaction she quantified the benefits of parallel prototyping and taught at the Hasso Plattner Institute of Design. At the Massachusetts Institute of Technology, she developed new active learning courses to improve user-centered design and emotional design pedagogy for engineers and product designers.

== Design career ==
Altringer was an early advocate of user-centered design and emotional design. In 2010, she joined Jochen Zeitz to develop the 2025 strategy for the luxury group, Kering, including a sustainable materials design lab and the first environmental profit and loss account. In 2015, Altringer joined the founding team of Piaggio Fast Forward as Chief Design Research Officer, to develop the Gita (mobile carrier) robot. Her design studio develops learning products including the Flavor Genome Project and Chef League that explore how to help users learn their own preferences. Her studio is the technical launch partner for Off Their Plate, an initiative providing economic relief to restaurant workers, while providing meals and care packages for frontline workers during the COVID-19 pandemic. In its first six weeks Off Their Plate provided emergency workers with 340,000 meals and $1.7 million in economic relief to restaurant workers.

== Academic career ==
Altringer joined the Harvard John A. Paulson School of Engineering and Applied Sciences in 2014. She teaches several Harvard courses, including the Innovators' Practice and Product and Experience Design: Experiential Lessons in Design for Desirability. In 2016, students voted her one of Harvard's top 15 professors. She is a founding faculty member of Harvard's joint Master of Science in Engineering and MBA Program and helped launch the Undergraduate Technology Innovation Fellows Program. She has published on topics including human-centered design, creativity, motivation and social psychology in creative work (with Beth Hennessey and Teresa Amabile), innovation methods beyond design thinking, and digital nomadic creative work.

In 2021 she joined Brown University and the Rhode Island School of Design as professor of practice and director of their joint Master of Arts in Design Engineering program.

== Awards and honors ==
- 2018: Top 50 Thinkers: Emerging thinkers with the potential to make lasting contributions
- 2016: Professors of the Year
- 2005: Holcim Awards for Sustainable Construction
- 2003: Fulbright Program, Fulbright Scholar
