= Mathias Payer =

Liechtensteinian computer scientist

Professor Mathias Payer
- Born: 1981 (age 44–45)
- Citizenship: Liechtenstein

Academic background
- Education: Computer Science
- Alma mater: ETH Zurich
- Doctoral advisor: Thomas R. Gross
- Other advisor: Dawn Song

Academic work
- Discipline: Computer science
- Sub-discipline: Software security Systems security
- Institutions: École Polytechnique Fédérale de Lausanne (EPFL)
- Main interests: System security Software security Mitigation; Sanitization; Test automation
- Website: https://hexhive.epfl.ch/

Mathias Payer (born 1981) is a Liechtensteiner computer scientist. His research is invested in software and system security. He is Associate Professor at the École Polytechnique Fédérale de Lausanne (EPFL) and head of the HexHive research group .

== Career ==
Mathias Payer studied computer science at ETH Zurich and received his master's degree in 2006. He then joined the Laboratory for Software Technology of Thomas R. Gross at ETH Zurich as a PhD student and graduated with a thesis on secure execution in 2012, focusing on techniques to mitigate control-flow hijacking attacks. In 2010, he was working at Google as software security engineer in the anti-malware and anti-phishing team, where he was dedicated detecting novel malware. In 2012, he joined Dawn Song's BitBlaze group at University of California, Berkeley as a postdoctoral scholar working on the analysis and classification of memory errors. In 2014, he received an appointment as Assistant Professor from Purdue University, where he founded his research laboratory, the HexHive Group. In 2018 he moved to EPFL as an assistant professor in Computer Science and received tenure in 2021. The HexHive Group is now located on the Lausanne Campus of EPFL.

== Research ==
Payer's research centers on software and systems security. He develops and refines tools that enable software developers to discover and patch software bugs, and thereby rendering their programs for resilient to potential software exploits. To reach this goal Payer employs two strategies. The first one are sanitization techniques that point to security issues of factors such as memory, type safety and API flow safety, and thereby enabling more salient products. The second are fuzzing techniques that create a set of input data for programs by combining static and dynamic analysis. The novel input data set extend and complement the set of existing test vectors. Using this newly created input data helps to uncover exploitable vulnerabilities, such as control-flow integrity making use of specific language semantics, requiring type integrity, and safeguarding selective data.

Payer's research has led to the discovery of several software vulnerabilities. Among them are the Bluetooth bugs BLURtooth and BLESA, and USBFuzz, a vulnerability that affects the implementation of USB protocol parsing across major operating systems.

Payer has been contributing to the development of the Decentralized Privacy-Preserving Proximity (DP-3T) protocol, on which the SwissCovid mobile application is built. The app allows for anonymous contact tracing to mitigate the COVID-19 pandemic.

Payer assisted the creation of the startup company xorlab that a former student of his, Antonio Barresi, founded.

He gained recognition beyond his research field through his lectures at the CCC - Chaos Communication Congress, the BHEU-Black Hat Europe, and others.

== Distinctions ==
He received the SNSF Eccellenza Award, and gained an ERC Starting Grant. He is an ACM Distinguished Member "for contributions to protecting systems in the presence of vulnerabilities".

== Selected works ==
- Durumeric, Zakir; Payer, Mathias; Paxson, Vern; Kasten, James; Adrian, David; Halderman, J. Alex; Bailey, Michael; Li, Frank; Weaver, Nicolas; Amann, Johanna; Beekman, Jethro (2014). "The Matter of Heartbleed". Proceedings of the 2014 Conference on Internet Measurement Conference - IMC '14. pp. 475–488. doi:10.1145/2663716.2663755. ISBN 9781450332132. S2CID 142767.
- Szekeres, L.; Payer, M.; Tao Wei; Song, Dawn (2013). "SoK: Eternal War in Memory". 2013 IEEE Symposium on Security and Privacy. pp. 48–62. doi:10.1109/SP.2013.13. ISBN 978-0-7695-4977-4. S2CID 2937041.
- Burow, Nathan; Carr, Scott A.; Nash, Joseph; Larsen, Per; Franz, Michael; Brunthaler, Stefan; Payer, Mathias (2017). "Control-Flow Integrity". ACM Computing Surveys. 50: 1–33. doi:10.1145/3054924. S2CID 1688011.
- Peng, Hui; Shoshitaishvili, Yan; Payer, Mathias (2018). "T-Fuzz: Fuzzing by Program Transformation". 2018 IEEE Symposium on Security and Privacy (SP). pp. 697–710. doi:10.1109/SP.2018.00056. ISBN 978-1-5386-4353-2. S2CID 4662297.
- Payer, Mathias; Barresi, Antonio; Gross, Thomas R. (2015). "Fine-Grained Control-Flow Integrity Through Binary Hardening". Detection of Intrusions and Malware, and Vulnerability Assessment. Lecture Notes in Computer Science. Vol. 9148. pp. 144–164. doi:10.1007/978-3-319-20550-2_8. ISBN 978-3-319-20549-6.
- Payer, Mathias (2016). "HexPADS: A Platform to Detect "Stealth" Attacks". Engineering Secure Software and Systems. Lecture Notes in Computer Science. Vol. 9639. pp. 138–154. doi:10.1007/978-3-319-30806-7_9. ISBN 978-3-319-30805-0.
- Ge, Xinyang; Talele, Nirupama; Payer, Mathias; Jaeger, Trent (2016). "Fine-Grained Control-Flow Integrity for Kernel Software". 2016 IEEE European Symposium on Security and Privacy (EuroS&P). pp. 179–194. doi:10.1109/EuroSP.2016.24. ISBN 978-1-5090-1751-5. S2CID 1407691.
