= Dawn Song =

American computer security expert

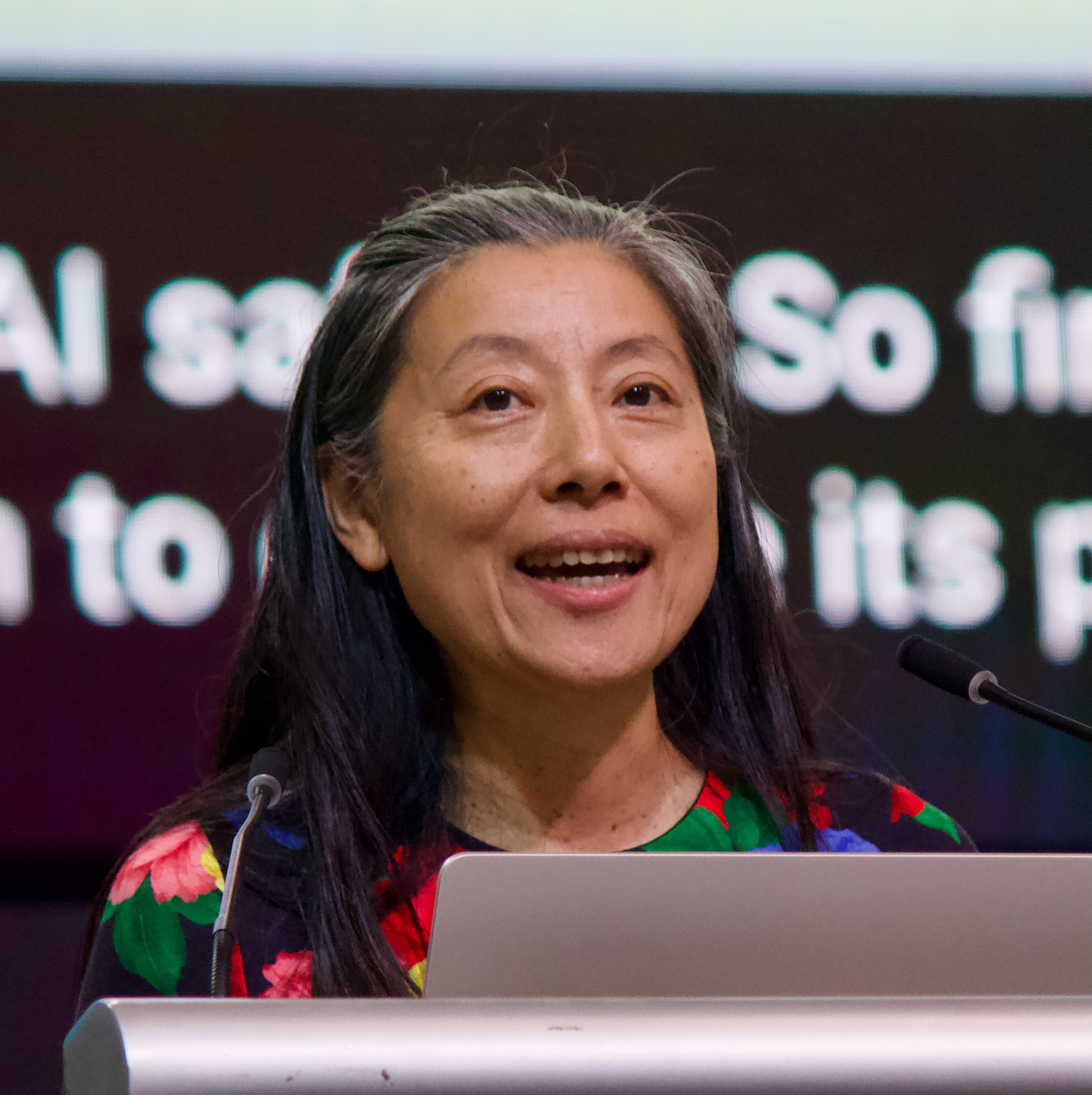
- Song at ICLR in 2025
- Education: Tsinghua University, Carnegie Mellon University, University of California, Berkeley
- Awards: MacArthur Fellowship (2010)
- Scientific career
- Fields: Electrical engineering, computer science
- Workplaces: Carnegie Mellon University, University of California, Berkeley

Dawn Song is a Chinese American academic and is a professor at the University of California, Berkeley, in the Electrical Engineering and Computer Science Department.

She received a MacArthur Foundation Fellowship in 2010.

== Education ==
Song earned her B.S. (1996) from Tsinghua University, her M.S. (1999) from Carnegie Mellon University, and her Ph.D. (2002) from the University of California, Berkeley.

== Career ==
Song became an assistant professor at Carnegie Mellon University (2002–2007) before joining the faculty at the University of California, Berkeley in 2007. At UC Berkeley, Song is also co-director of the campus-wide Berkeley Center for Responsible, Decentralized Intelligence (RDI).

Song's work addresses computer security and has included web security and systems security, for example working on the DARPA Cyber Grand Challenge, where her team placed among the top seven finalists. Her more recent work has addressed adversarial machine learning and blockchains.

In 2018, Song co-founded Oasis Labs, a startup using blockchain technology for privacy.

In 2024, Song co-founded Virtue AI with three other researchers. In late June 2026, she and two other cofounders joined Meta, where Song became Vice President of AI Research at Meta Superintelligence Labs. In August, Virtue AI was acquired by Fortinet. On October 2, 2026, Semafor reported that Meta was letting go of employees hired from Virtue AI, with a Meta spokesperson attributing the separation to "clashing work styles."

== Recognition ==
Song is the recipient of numerous awards, including a Sloan Fellowship, an NSF CAREER Award, the IBM Faculty Award, a Guggenheim fellowship, and a MacArthur Foundation Fellowship. In 2009, the MIT Technology Review TR35 named Song as one of the top 35 innovators in The World under the age of 35. She was elected as an ACM Fellow in 2019 "for contributions to security and privacy".
