= Nathan Eagle =

American technology executive

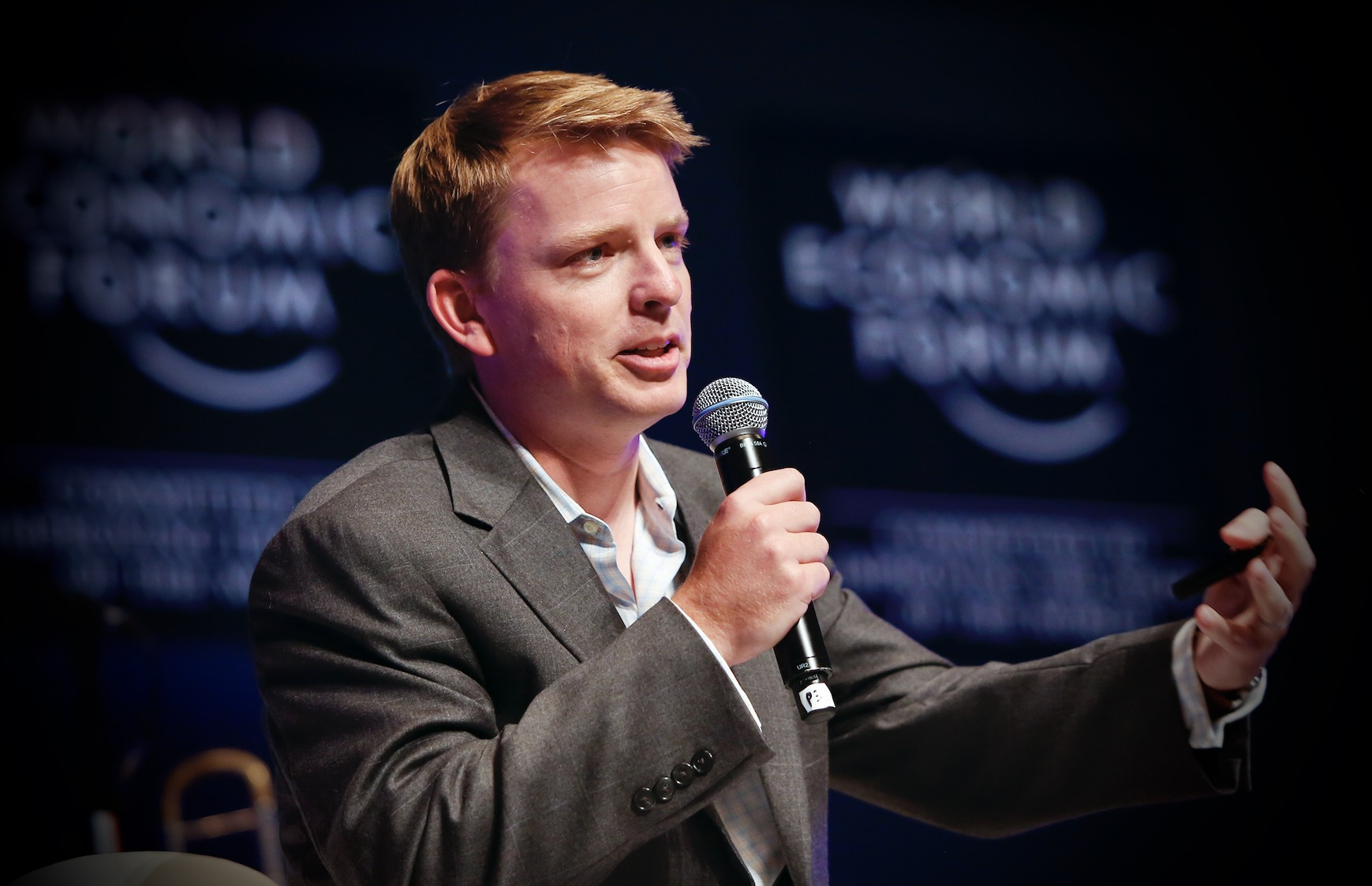
- Nathan Eagle delivering the closing plenary to the 2013 World Economic Forum in Davos
- Born: December 30, 1976 (age 49); California
- Education: Stanford and MIT
- Occupation: Technology executive
- Spouse(s): Beth Altringer; Caroline Buckee, div.

Nathan Eagle is an American technology executive. He is best known as the CEO and co-founder of Jana (formerly txteagle), a company that subsidizes mobile internet access in emerging markets. He has also served as a professor at both Harvard University and the Massachusetts Institute of Technology.

== Education ==
Eagle received a B.S. in Mechanical Engineering from Stanford University in 1999 before moving to Nepal to develop hydroelectric power generation technology as a Fulbright scholar. Between 2001 and 2005 he received two master's degrees from Stanford in Electrical Engineering and Management Science and Engineering, and a PhD from MIT, pioneering the use of artificial intelligence to predict human behavior from mobile phone data.

== Career ==
=== Early Academic Work ===
In his doctoral research, he gave 100 volunteers from the MIT community smartphones that logged their activity over the 2004–05 academic year, creating a dataset of more than 350,000 hours of communication, proximity, location and activity information. According to Wired Magazine, “Eagle's algorithms were able to predict what people -- especially professors and Media Lab employees -- would do next and be right up to 85 percent of the time.” This work illustrated how mobile phones can be used to collect accurate, large-scale data about real social interactions. The data has been analyzed in hundreds of academic publications and the research was named one of the "10 Technologies Most Likely To Change The Way We Live" by the MIT Technology Review.

As a research scientist at MIT and Fulbright Professor at the University of Nairobi in 2006, Eagle developed a mobile phone programming curriculum that has been adopted by twelve Sub-Saharan computer science departments, leading to hundreds of mobile applications.

As a postdoctoral fellow at the Santa Fe Institute in 2010, he and Eric Horvitz launched an initiative called Artificial Intelligence for Development. This initiative led to a diverse set of projects ranging from computational models of food shortages to studies on the dynamics of slums.

As an adjunct assistant professor at Harvard University in 2011, he formed the Engineering Social Systems group, with researchers in fields ranging from epidemiology and public health to statistical physics and urban planning, dedicated to the analysis of large scale data for social purposes.

Eagle has authored 8 patents and over 100 peer reviewed publications in journals including Science and Nature, accumulating more than 10,000 citations. Eagle's book from MIT Press, Reality Mining: Using Big Data to Engineer a Better World, won the 2015 American Publishers PROSE Award.

=== txteagle / Jana ===
Based on his work while living in East Africa, Eagle co-founded txteagle with Benjamin Olding in 2009 from the conviction that “mobile phones not only provide a mechanism for global communication, they also allow for global compensation”. The service originally enabled people in emerging markets to earn small amounts of money by completing simple tasks for organizations such as the United Nations and the World Bank. These tasks expanded to include market research surveys for FMCG companies including Procter & Gamble, Unilever, and Johnson & Johnson, as well as the news organizations CNN and Al Jazeera. txteagle rebranded as “Jana” in 2011.

Eagle led Jana to profitability in 2015, in large part due to partnerships with technology companies including Google, Microsoft, Twitter, and Amazon. Eagle subsequently raised an additional $57 million round of funding led by Verizon, with Tim Armstrong joining the advisory board, expanding Jana's service to 90 countries though partnerships with 311 mobile operators. By 2017, Jana was regularly providing up to 70 megabytes of free data per day to 40 million people. By 2019, 75 million people had used Jana's products to gain affordable access to the internet.

Eagle became a vocal advocate of net neutrality and Jana's social mission to provide unrestricted internet access for a billion people. He often emphasized that if Jana succeeds in redirecting 30% of the $200 billion spent on advertising in the developing world into subsidies for mobile internet, that would be the equivalent of giving one billion people a 5% raise.

Eagle began to take an interest in the life sciences and joined the Longevity Fund as a Limited Partner in 2017. By 2019, after 12 years as CEO and raising nearly $100 million, Eagle stepped down from Jana to pursue entrepreneurial interests in synthetic biology and the biopharmaceutical industry full-time.

== Awards and recognition ==
- 2014 - 2019: World Economic Forum, Technology Pioneer
- 2014: Ad Age, 40 under 40 Award
- 2012: Kiel Institute, Global Economy Prize
- 2012: Wired Magazine, The 50 People Who Will Change the World
- 2012: Market Research Society, President's Medal
- 2009: MIT Technology Review, 35 Innovators Under 35
- 1999: Stanford Technology Ventures Program, Mayfield Fellow
