= Caroline Buckee =

Epidemiologist and Associate Professor

Caroline O'Flaherty Buckee
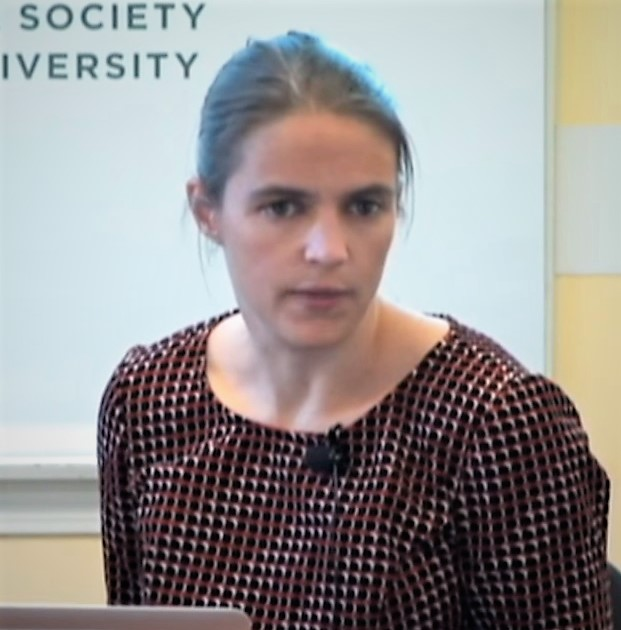
- Buckee speaks at the Berkman Klein Center for Internet & Society in 2017
- Born: 1979 (age 46–47)
- Education: University of Edinburgh; University of York; University of Oxford
- Spouse: Nathan Eagle (former)
- Scientific career
- Fields: Epidemiology
- Workplaces: Harvard T.H. Chan School of Public Health
- Thesis: The evolution and maintenance of pathogen diversity (2005)
- Doctoral advisor: Sunetra Gupta

Caroline O'Flaherty Buckee (born 1979) is an epidemiologist. She is a Professor of Epidemiology at the Harvard T.H. Chan School of Public Health. Buckee is known for her work in digital epidemiology, where mathematical models track mobile and satellite data to understand the transmission of infectious diseases through populations in an effort to understand the spatial dynamics of disease transmission. Her work examines the implications of conducting surveillance and implementing control programs as a way to understand and predict what will happen when dealing with outbreaks of infectious diseases like malaria and COVID-19.

== Early life and education ==
Growing up, Buckee's family moved around the globe for her father's work in the oil industry, living in Alaska, Norway, Canada, the Middle East, and the United Kingdom. In 2000, Buckee received her BSc degree in zoology from the University of Edinburgh. As an undergraduate, she conducted field research in Tanzania in East Africa, where she first encountered a malaria clinic that sparked her interest in infectious diseases.

Buckee then attended the University of York where she received her Master of Research (MRes) degree in Bioinformatics in 2002. She next began her doctorate degree at the University of Oxford in 2002, studying Mathematical Epidemiology working under the mentorship of Sunetra Gupta. There, she studied how ecological factors influenced the population dynamics and strain diversity of the bacterium that causes meningitis, Neisseria meningitidis. She completed her dissertation, entitled The evolution and maintenance of pathogen diversity, in 2005 and received her PhD in 2006.

== Career ==
Following graduate school, Buckee became a postdoctoral researcher, supported by the Wellcome Trust, at the Kenya Medical Research Institute. There, she began working with mobile phone location data to understand the effect human migration patterns and on malaria disease transmission. She then became an Omidyar Fellow at the Santa Fe Institute, a multi-disciplinary nonprofit research institute that focuses on the study of complex adaptive systems, to continue this work.

In 2010, Buckee joined the faculty at Harvard T.H. Chan School of Public Health. Her research program centers on understanding how human pathogens spread and how their spread might be controlled using a combination of genomics to understand their biology and mathematical modeling techniques to understand and forecast their spread. She is particularly interested in understanding and mitigating the burden of infectious diseases among low-income populations. Buckee has become known as a pioneer in digital epidemiology, taking advantage of mobile phone and satellite data to understand patterns of human travel and their impact on the spread of diseases.

=== Digital epidemiology ===
In 2012, Buckee's research group published a study that used mobile phone data to track the spread of malaria in Kenya. Using data collected from text messages and cell phone calls between June 2008 and 2009, they found patterns of malaria transmission that mapped onto heavily trafficked roads. Thus, her group was able to map transmission risk, demonstrating that data derived from mobile phones were a powerful and low-cost epidemiological tool to better inform and prepare public health officials. Her group later used cell phone data from 40 million users, which was made available by the phone company Telenor, in a proof of concept study forecasting Dengue fever outbreaks in Pakistan.

=== Hurricane Maria ===
In the wake of Hurricane Maria, which devastated Puerto Rico in September 2017, Buckee worked with researchers at Carlos Albizu University to estimate the number of fatalities due to the storm. She wanted to understand how far off the official death toll was and devised a strategy to arrive at a more accurate estimate. She and her colleagues met in Puerto Rico and surveyed over 3 thousand randomly chosen households to assess the damage and deaths caused by the storm, ultimately estimating the actual death toll was closer to 5,000 between 20 September and 31 December 2017. Their calculated death toll was approximately 73 times the official fatality report.

=== COVID-19 ===
Buckee co-leads the COVID-19 Mobility Network, a coalition of infectious disease epidemiologists from over a dozen universities working to understand the coronavirus disease 2019 (COVID-19) pandemic. The group is now utilising mobility data provided by Facebook's Data for Good program, which released a series of disease prevention maps for research use, both to understand the impact of social distancing measures and to utilise for contact tracing and disease forecasting. In April 2020, she co-authored an op-ed in The Washington Post noting the various approaches to social distancing taken by different states has created a natural set of experimental conditions with which to test the efficacy of different policies. She and her colleagues have since advocated for the use of aggregated and anonymised mobility data—taking into account appropriate user privacy and security measures—to understand the effectiveness of these different policies, as well as their accompanying public health messaging, in effectively executing large-scale social distancing measures.

== Selected works and publications ==
- Salathé, Marcel; Bengtsson, Linus; Bodnar, Todd J.; Brewer, Devon D.; Brownstein, John S.; Buckee, Caroline; Campbell, Ellsworth M.; Cattuto, Ciro; Khandelwal, Shashank; Mabry, Patricia L.; Vespignani, Alessandro; Bourne, Philip E. (26 July 2012). "Digital Epidemiology". PLOS Computational Biology. 8 (7) e1002616. Bibcode:2012PLSCB...8E2616S. doi:10.1371/JOURNAL.PCBI.1002616. PMC 3406005. PMID 22844241. Wikidata ()
- Wesolowski, Amy; Eagle, Nathan; Tatem, Andrew J.; Smith, David L.; Noor, Abdisalan M.; Snow, Robert W.; Buckee, Caroline O. (12 October 2012). "Quantifying the Impact of Human Mobility on Malaria". Science. 338 (6104): 267–270. Bibcode:2012Sci...338..267W. doi:10.1126/science.1223467. PMC 3675794. PMID 23066082. Wikidata ()
- Reiner, Robert C.; Perkins, T. Alex; Barker, Christopher M.; Niu, Tianchan; Chaves, Luis Fernando; Ellis, Alicia M.; George, Dylan B.; Le Menach, Arnaud; Pulliam, Juliet R. C.; Bisanzio, Donal; Buckee, Caroline; Chiyaka, Christinah; Cummings, Derek A. T.; Garcia, Andres J.; Gatton, Michelle L.; Gething, Peter W.; Hartley, David M.; Johnston, Geoffrey; Klein, Eili Y.; Michael, Edwin; Lindsay, Steven W.; Lloyd, Alun L.; Pigott, David M.; Reisen, William K.; Ruktanonchai, Nick; Singh, Brajendra K.; Tatem, Andrew J.; Kitron, Uriel; Hay, Simon I.; Scott, Thomas W.; Smith, David L. (6 April 2013). "A systematic review of mathematical models of mosquito-borne pathogen transmission: 1970–2010". Journal of the Royal Society Interface. 10 (81) 20120921. doi:10.1098/RSIF.2012.0921. PMC 3627099. PMID 23407571. Wikidata ()
- Larremore, Daniel B.; Sundararaman, Sesh A.; Liu, Weimin; Proto, William R.; Clauset, Aaron; Loy, Dorothy E.; Speede, Sheri; Plenderleith, Lindsey J.; Sharp, Paul M.; Hahn, Beatrice H.; Rayner, Julian C.; Buckee, Caroline O. (12 October 2015). "Ape parasite origins of human malaria virulence genes". Nature Communications. 6: 8368. Bibcode:2015NatCo...6.8368L. doi:10.1038/NCOMMS9368. PMC 4633637. PMID 26456841. Wikidata ()
- Wesolowski, Amy; Qureshi, Taimur; Boni, Maciej F.; Sundsøy, Pål Roe; Johansson, Michael A.; Rasheed, Syed Basit; Engø-Monsen, Kenth; Buckee, Caroline O. (22 September 2015). "Impact of human mobility on the emergence of dengue epidemics in Pakistan". Proceedings of the National Academy of Sciences. 112 (38): 11887–11892. Bibcode:2015PNAS..11211887W. doi:10.1073/PNAS.1504964112. PMC 4586847. PMID 26351662. Wikidata ()
- Buckee, Caroline (January 2017). "Using Cell Phones to Fight Infectious Disease". Trends in Parasitology. 33 (1): 1–2. doi:10.1016/J.PT.2016.10.011. PMID 27890329. Wikidata ()
- Peak, Corey M.; Childs, Lauren M.; Grad, Yonatan H.; Buckee, Caroline O. (11 April 2017). "Comparing nonpharmaceutical interventions for containing emerging epidemics". PNAS. 114 (15): 4023–4028. Bibcode:2017PNAS..114.4023P. doi:10.1073/PNAS.1616438114. PMC 5393248. PMID 28351976. Wikidata ()
- Kishore, Nishant; Marqués, Domingo; Mahmud, Ayesha; Kiang, Mathew V.; Rodriguez, Irmary; Fuller, Arlan; Ebner, Peggy; Sorensen, Cecilia; Racy, Fabio; Lemery, Jay; Maas, Leslie; Leaning, Jennifer; Irizarry, Rafael A.; Balsari, Satchit; Buckee, Caroline O. (12 July 2017). "Mortality in Puerto Rico after Hurricane Maria" (PDF). New England Journal of Medicine. 379 (2): 162–170. doi:10.1056/NEJMsa1803972. PMID 29809109. Wikidata ()
- Buckee, Caroline O.; Balsari, Satchit; Chan, Jennifer; Crosas, Mercè; Dominici, Francesca; Gasser, Urs; Grad, Yonatan H.; Grenfell, Bryan; Halloran, M. Elizabeth; Kraemer, Moritz U. G.; Lipsitch, Marc; Metcalf, C. Jessica E.; Ancel Meyers, Lauren; Perkins, T. Alex; Santillana, Mauricio; Scarpino, Samuel V.; Viboud, Cecile; Wesolowski, Amy; Schroeder, Andrew (10 April 2020). "Aggregated mobility data could help fight COVID-19". Science. 368 (6487): 145–146. Bibcode:2020Sci...368..145B. doi:10.1126/science.abb8021. PMID 32205458. Wikidata ()

== Awards and honors ==
- 2013: CNN, Top 10 Thinker
- 2013: Foreign Policy, Top 100 Global Thinker
- 2013: MIT Technology Review, 35 Innovators Under 35
- 2019: Harvard University, Alice Hamilton Award
