= ICLR =

The acronym ICLR may refer to:

- Incorporated Council of Law Reporting, a British registered charity
- International Comparative Literature Association, an international organization dedicated to comparative literature
- International Conference on Learning Representations, a machine learning conference.
