= E-epidemiology =

E-epidemiology, also known as digital epidemiology, is the science underlying the acquisition, maintenance, and application of epidemiological knowledge through digital media such as the Internet, mobile phones, digital paper, and digital TV. It includes large-scale epidemiological studies increasingly conducted through distributed global collaborations enabled by the Internet.

== Advantages of E-epidemiology ==
Traditionally, performing epidemiological trials with paper questionnaires has been both costly and time-consuming, requiring significant personnel to transform physical data into analyzable formats. In contrast, modern communication tools allow for the rapid and cost-efficient assembly of data. Modern IT infrastructure provides the means for storing and organizing vast amounts of biological and lifestyle data, while high-performance computing and simulation-based inference procedures allow researchers to examine variables from complex data structures. Web portals directly enable efficient participant feedback, facilitate the use of interactive tools like animations, and allow researchers to disseminate their findings more easily. By transitioning questionnaire models into digital formats, researchers can increase interactivity and improve the flow of information between the participant and the investigator. Beyond these general benefits of digitization, E-epidemiology also enables improved longitudinal tracking of participants over time, supports real-time disease surveillance, and allows for integration with electronic health records, capabilities that are particularly valuable for population-level research.

== Disadvantages of E-epidemiology ==
Despite its evident advantages over traditional methodologies, E-epidemiology introduces distinct challenges that researchers must navigate. One significant hurdle is the heightened need for security and confidentiality solutions to protect individual integrity and data ownership. As the handling of personal records requires robust security programs and firewalls, researchers must protect both the digital data and the identities of their participants.

Another disadvantage of E-epidemiology that must be addressed is its inherent biases. Despite the digital nature of these tools, they remain subject to many of the same limitations and biases as traditional epidemiology methods. For instance, online surveys are still vulnerable to non-response bias, social desirability bias, and interviewer bias.

A further concern is the digital divide, the tendency for internet-based studies to systematically underrepresent older adults, lower-income populations, and people in low-connectivity regions, which can introduce significant sampling bias at the population level. These factors must be addressed during the study design and data collection phases to prevent the generation of skewed or inaccurate results. Accounting for these complexities is especially critical in E-epidemiology given that its findings are often applied at the population level.

== See also ==
- Epidemiology
- Mathematical modelling of infectious disease
- World Community Grid
- HealthMap

== Bibliography ==
Sanders, C. K., & Scanlon, E. (2021). The Digital Divide Is a Human Rights Issue: Advancing Social Inclusion Through Social Work Advocacy. Journal of human rights and social work, 6(2), 130–143. https://doi.org/10.1007/s41134-020-00147-9

Ebert, J. F., Huibers, L., Christensen, B., & Christensen, M. B. (2018). Paper- or Web-Based Questionnaire Invitations as a Method for Data Collection: Cross-Sectional Comparative Study of Differences in Response Rate, Completeness of Data, and Financial Cost. Journal of medical Internet research, 20(1), e24. https://doi.org/10.2196/jmir.8353

Casey, J. A., Schwartz, B. S., Stewart, W. F., & Adler, N. E. (2016). Using Electronic Health Records for Population Health Research: A Review of Methods and Applications. Annual review of public health, 37, 61–81. https://doi.org/10.1146/annurev-publhealth-032315-021353 Blumenberg, C., & Barros, A. J. (2016). Electronic data collection in epidemiological research. The use of REDCap in the Pelotas birth cohorts. Applied clinical informatics, 7(3), 672–681. https://doi.org/10.4338/ACI-2016-02-RA-0028

Fallatah, D. I., & Adekola, H. A. (2024). Digital epidemiology: harnessing big data for early detection and monitoring of viral outbreaks. Infection prevention in practice, 6(3), 100382. https://doi.org/10.1016/j.infpip.2024.100382

Brownstein, John S.; Freifeld, Clark C.; Madoff, Lawrence C. (2009). "Digital Disease Detection — Harnessing the Web for Public Health Surveillance". New England Journal of Medicine. 360 (21): 2153–2157. doi:10.1056/NEJMp0900702. ISSN 0028-4793. PMC 2917042. PMID 19423867.

Kamel Boulos MN; Cai Q; Padget JA; Rushton G (April 2006). "Using software agents to preserve individual health data confidentiality in micro-scale geographical analyses". J Biomed Inform. 39 (2): 160–70. doi:10.1016/j.jbi.2005.06.003. PMID 16098819. Miquel Porta (2014) A dictionary of epidemiology, 6th edn, New York: Oxford University Press. ISBN 9780199976737.

Marcano Belisario, J. S., Jamsek, J., Huckvale, K., O'Donoghue, J., Morrison, C. P., & Car, J. (2015). Comparison of self-administered survey questionnaire responses collected using mobile apps versus other methods. The Cochrane database of systematic reviews, 2015(7), MR000042. https://doi.org/10.1002/14651858.MR000042.pub2

Wyatt J. C. (2000). When to use web-based surveys. Journal of the American Medical Informatics Association : JAMIA, 7(4), 426–429. https://doi.org/10.1136/jamia.2000.0070426

Zhu, O. Y., Greene, D., & Dolnicar, S. (2024). Should the risk of social desirability bias in survey studies be assessed at the level of each pro-environmental behaviour? Tourism Management, 104, 104933. https://doi.org/10.1016/j.tourman.2024.104933

Bozman, C. S., & Stem, D. E., Jr. (2005). Non-response error within internet surveys: A cautionary note. Journal of International Information Management, 14(2), Article 3. https://scholarworks.lib.csusb.edu/jiim/vol14/iss2/3

Spencer, N. H., Syrdal, D. S., Coates, M., & Huws, U. (2022). Assessing bias in online surveys using alternative survey modes. Work Organisation, Labour & Globalisation, 16(1), 34–51. https://www.jstor.org/stable/48675868
