= China Kingho Group =

Chinese coal mining company

- Native name: 中国庆华集团
- Industry: Coal industry
- Founded: 1996; 30 years ago
- Headquarters: Beijing, China
- Area served: China, Hong Kong, Mozambique, Sierra Leone
- Key people: Huo Qinghua (Chairman)
- Website: chinakingho.com

China Kingho Group (simplified Chinese: 中国庆华集团; traditional Chinese: 中國慶華集團; pinyin: Zhōngguó Qìnghuá Jítuán) is the largest private coal mining company in China.

In 2011, the company announced a large investment in Mozambique. The company is to build a coal terminal at the Beira port and upgrade the Sena railway which links to the Moatize coal mines.

A planned development of coal fields in Pakistan's south Sindh province collapsed in August 2011. The $19 billion proposed deal would have been Pakistan's largest foreign investment deal.
