= African Responses to Ebola Outbreak =

Public health communication in Africa

African Responses to Ebola Outbreak involves all the actions and strategies that are put in place in order to ensure that up to date information on the Ebola virus is shared between health experts, officials and the community. In 2008, a 10-step approach was developed by the CDC and ASTHO for health communications with communities, faith-based organizations and government.

== Background on Ebola ==
Ebola is a rare and serious illness. It causes a headache, fever, bleeding, and body weakness. The virus is spread by direct contact with an infected person's body fluid (e.g., urine, sweat and blood). Most outbreaks occur in West Africa and Central Africa, where health teams work quickly to treat patients and stop the diseases.

== Public health communication during Ebola outbreaks ==
Health communication and community outreaches are key strategies for emergency public health response plan. Effective strategies involve leveraging diverse educational tools such as infographics, health awareness campaigns and pre recorded videos while evaluating outcomes to address information gaps. In additional, successful responses require maintaining partnerships with government and community organizations, alongside coordinating cross border advisories and incorporating local cultural context to manage viral outbreaks.

== Efforts ==
On 6 June 2026, Africa CDC and World Health Organization partnered for a swift response during Ebola outbreaks across countries in Africa.
