= International Mutual Aid =

Non-profit organization providing disaster and emergency medical assistance

- Founded: November 2014
- Location(s): Kono District, Sierra Leone and Abingdon, Maryland
- Website: https://www.im-aid.org/

International Mutual Aid (IMA) is a Maryland 501(c)(3) registered nonprofit organization working to provide disaster and emergency medical assistance to underserved populations outside of the US.

International Mutual Aid was founded in November 2014 in response to the Ebola virus epidemic in West Africa. IMA deployed a medical team to Kono District, Sierra Leone in December 2014.

This team remained in place for the duration of the Kono Ebola epidemic, coordinating with local resources to run a free primary care clinic, conduct Ebola surveillance, contact tracing, initial treatment for suspect Ebola cases, and provide public education.

International Mutual Aid remains engaged in healthcare system strengthening efforts in Kono District, Sierra Leone. Kono.

== See also ==
- Ebola virus epidemic in West Africa
- Ebola virus epidemic in Sierra Leone
- Ebola virus epidemic in Guinea
- Ebola virus epidemic in Liberia
- Ebola virus disease in Mali
- Ebola virus disease
- Health in Sierra Leone
- List of Ebola patients
