= HealthMap =

Disease outbreak surveillance software

HealthMap is a freely accessible, automated electronic information system for monitoring, organizing, and visualizing reports of global disease outbreaks according to geography, time, and infectious disease agent. In operation since September 2006, and created by John Brownstein, PhD and Clark Freifeld, PhD, HealthMap acquires data from a variety of freely available electronic media sources (e.g. ProMED-mail, Eurosurveillance, Wildlife Disease Information Node) to obtain a comprehensive view of the current global state of infectious diseases.

Users of HealthMap come from a variety of organizations including state and local public health agencies, the World Health Organization (WHO), the US Centers for Disease Control and Prevention, and the European Centre for Disease Prevention and Control. HealthMap is used both as an early detection system and supports situational awareness by providing current, highly local information about outbreaks, even from areas relatively invisible to traditional global public health efforts. Currently, HealthMap monitors information sources in English, Chinese, Spanish, Russian, French, Portuguese, and Arabic.

In March 2014, the Healthmap software tracked early press and social media reports of a hemorrhagic fever in West Africa, subsequently identified by WHO as Ebola. The HealthMap team subsequently created a dedicated HealthMap visualization at healthmap.org/ebola.

As early as December 2019, HealthMap recorded a striking cluster of pneumonia cases in the Wuhan area, the suspected point of origin of the subsequent coronavirus pandemic.

== See also ==
- Crowdmapping
