= West African Ebola virus epidemic timeline =

Timeline of the Ebola virus disease epidemic in 2014–15

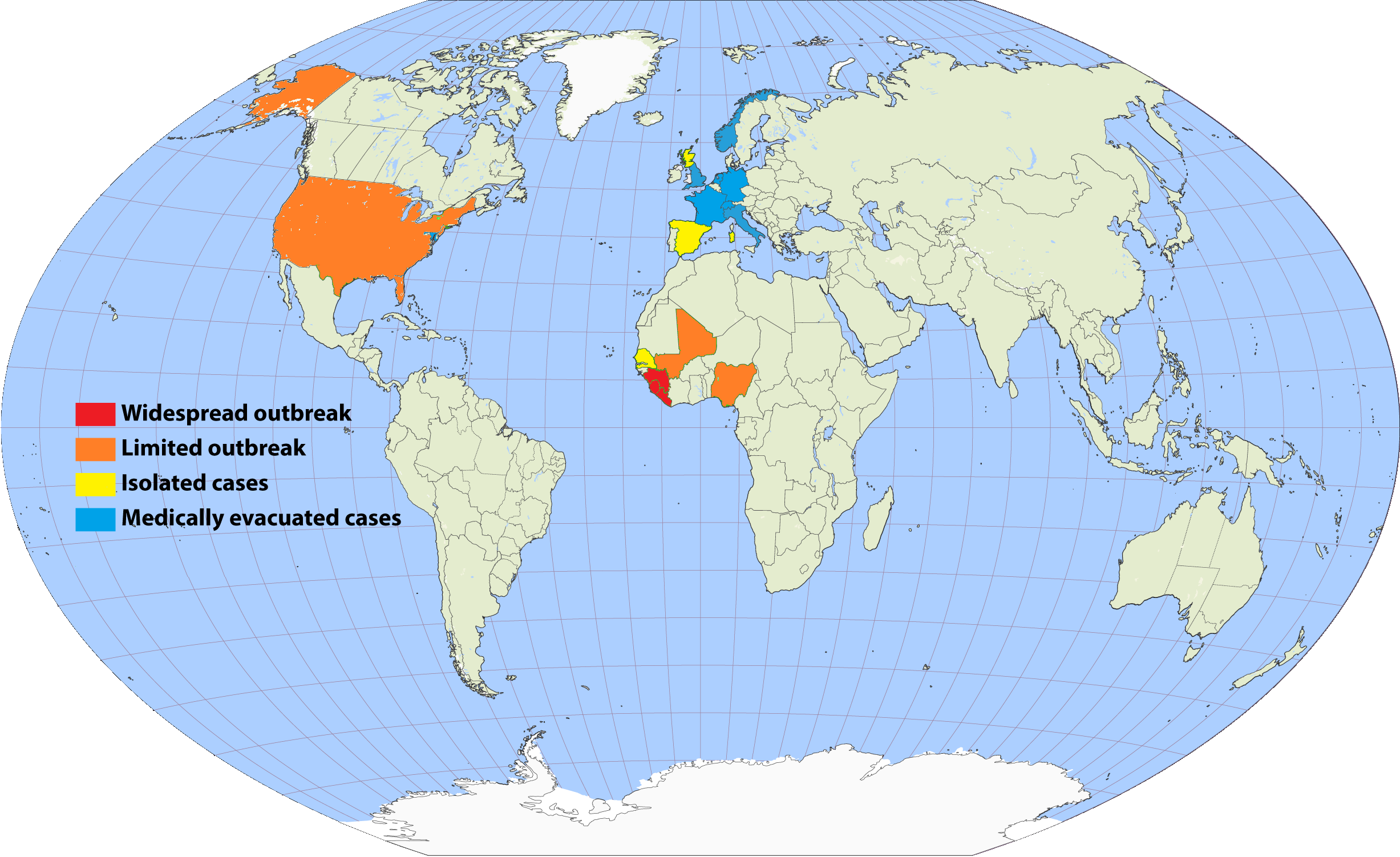
- West Africa Ebola Outbreak Map
- Duration: 2013–2016
- Location: West Africa region (initially)

This article covers the timeline of the 2014 Ebola virus epidemic in West Africa and its outbreaks elsewhere. Flag icons denote the first announcements of confirmed cases by the respective nation-states, their first deaths, and their first secondary transmissions, as well as relevant sessions and announcements of agencies such as the World Health Organization (WHO), the U.S. Centers for Disease Control (CDC), and NGOs such as Doctors Without Borders; medical evacuations, visa restrictions, border closures, quarantines, court rulings, and possible cases of zoonosis are also included.

== Timeline ==
Take note that the date of the first confirmations of the disease or any event in a country may be before or after the date of the events in local time because of the International Dateline.

=== December 2013 ===
Guinea Researchers believe that a 2-year-old boy was the index case of the current Ebola virus disease epidemic. He died in December 2013 in the village of Meliandou, Guéckédou Prefecture. His mother, sister, and grandmother then became ill with similar symptoms and also died. Although Ebola represents a significant public health problem in sub-Saharan Africa and was documented in Tai Forest chimpanzees, only one case had been reported in humans in West Africa. With this background and in the context of poor public health systems, the early cases were mis-diagnosed as diseases more common to the area. Thus Ebola virus disease spread for several months before it was recognized as such. In late October 2014, the child was identified as Emile Ouamouno. A tree was later identified in the area where children were known to play with insect-eating Angolan free-tailed bats and hunting and grilling them to eat. Contact with these bats, which are well-known Ebola reservoirs, may have been the immediate cause of the outbreak, though this remains speculative.

=== March 2014 ===
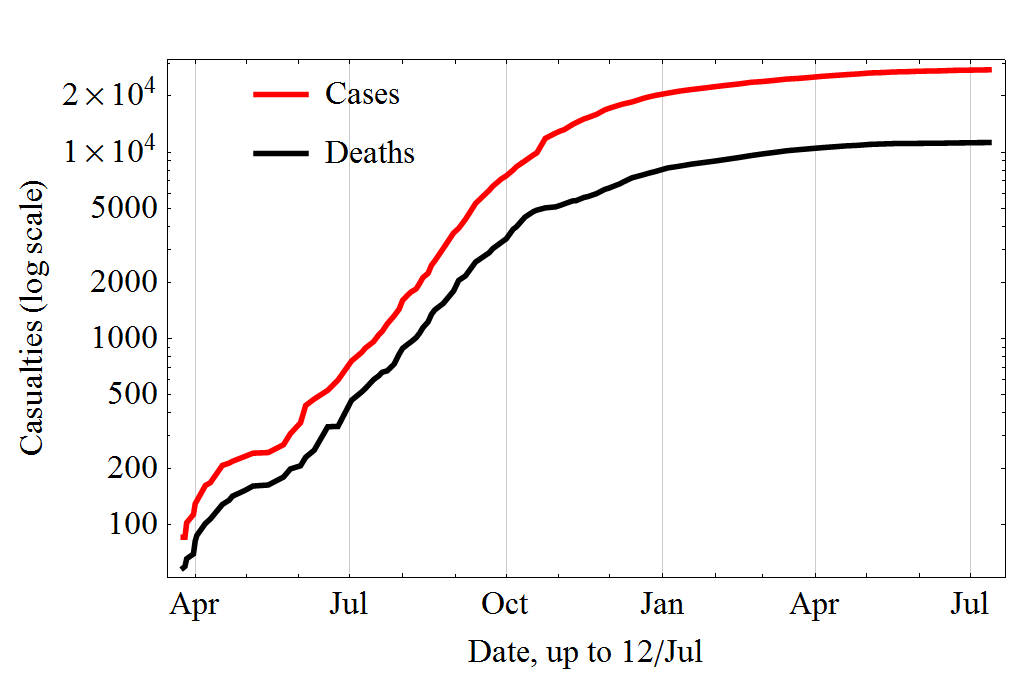
Evolution of the 2014 Ebola outbreak in semiLog plot

Guinea On March 18 Guinean health officials announce the outbreak of a mysterious hemorrhagic fever "which strikes like lightning." 35 cases are reported, and at least 23 people died. On March 22, Guinea confirms the fever as Ebola, with 59 possible fatalities.

Liberia On March 24, two suspected cases in Liberia are announced by the Liberian Ministries of Information, Culture, Tourism, and Health. The government had also stated that Ebola had 'crossed over into Liberia,' but did not confirm the information.

(Switzerland) Médecins Sans Frontières On March 24, Médecins Sans Frontières / Doctors Without Borders (MSF) establish an isolation center in Guéckédou Prefecture, Guinea, the first in West Africa to be built expressly for the purpose of halting the epidemic.

United Nations On March 25, the World Health Organization (WHO) released its first report concerning Ebola in West Africa, wherein it is stated that thirteen Guinean cases from four districts of the country were confirmed by the Institut Pasteur and the Centre International de Recherche en Infectiologie in Lyon.

Mauritania Since 26 March, Mauritania closed all crossings along the Senegal River, the natural border between Mauritania and Senegal, except for the Rosso and Diama points of entry.

Liberia On March 27, the government of Liberia revised its statement from March 24 stating that Ebola was not present within the country -a later report from the WHO reversed the country's position a second time.

Senegal On March 28 Senegal closed its border with Guinea in an effort to halt the virus from spreading.

Liberia On March 31 the first cases of EVD are confirmed in Liberia, in two patients in Lofa and Nimba counties -they had been the subject of a March 24 press report on EVD mentioned previously. The patient in Lofa County died on the day of her diagnosis, becoming the first death in Liberia.

United States On March 31, the Centers for Disease Control and Prevention (CDC) sent a five-person team to Guinea for the purpose of aiding the Guinean Ministry of Health and the WHO in containing the outbreak.

United Nations By the end of March, the WHO announced that there had been 112 cases and 70 deaths due to Ebola overall (including suspected cases.) Two confirmed cases originated in Liberia, and several suspected cases were reported from Sierra Leone and Liberia.

=== April 2014 ===
Mali On April 7, six suspected cases were announced by Mali but were later confirmed as not being related to EVD.

Liberia On April 12, new cases were reported in Margibi and Montserrado counties, raising the total number of counties holding patients with EVD to four.

Guinea On April 30, Guinea's Ministry of Health reported 221 suspected and confirmed cases as well as 146 deaths in Guinea alone. Of the 221, 26 were health workers.

United Nations By the end of April, WHO statistics showed 239 cases and 160 deaths overall.

=== May 2014 ===
Guinea On May 12, cases were reported in Conakry, the capital of Guinea and a city with a population of around two million people.

Sierra Leone On May 26 WHO reports the first cases and deaths in Sierra Leone, in Kailahun District. They are traced back to the funeral of a widely respected traditional healer from Kailahun who had contracted the disease after treating Ebola patients from across the border in Guinea.

United Nations By the end of May, WHO statistics showed 383 cases and 211 deaths overall.

=== June 2014 ===
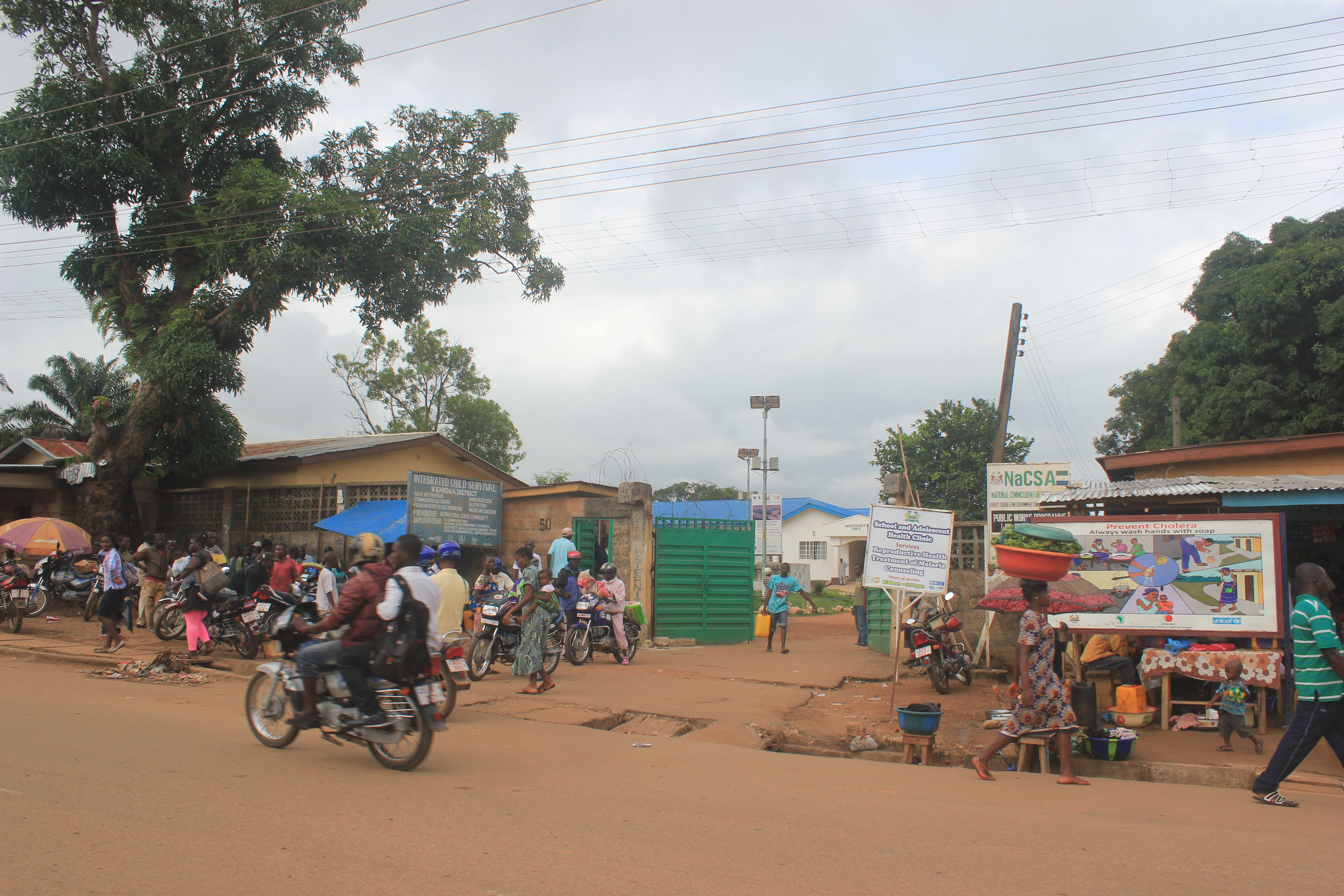
Kenema Hospital in Kenema, Sierra Leone

Sierra Leone On June 11, Sierra Leone closed its borders with Liberia and Guinea and closed a number of schools around the country. On 30 July, the government began to deploy troops to enforce quarantines.

Liberia On June 17, Liberia reports that EVD has reached its capital, Monrovia.

Sierra Leone On June 20, the WHO announces up to 158 cases in Sierra Leone. In addition to Kailahun District, cases were also reported in Kenema, Kambia, Port Loko, and Western Area Rural districts.

(Switzerland) Médecins Sans Frontières On June 21, Doctors Without Borders declares the second wave of the outbreak "totally out of control" and calls for massive resources.

United Nations By the end of June, WHO statistics showed 779 cases and 481 deaths overall.

=== July 2014 ===
Sierra Leone On July 14, the Bo District of central Sierra Leone reports its first case.

Sierra Leone On July 17, the number of EVD cases in Sierra Leone surpasses those of Liberia and Guinea at 442.

United Nations On July 18 WHO regards the disease trend in Sierra Leone and Liberia as "serious" with 67 new cases and 19 deaths reported to date.

Nigeria On July 25 Nigeria reports its first fatality, a Liberian-American man who died in Lagos.

Sierra Leone On July 25, the first case in Freetown, Sierra Leone's capital, is recorded. The city has a population of over one million people.

Liberia On July 27, Liberian President Ellen Johnson Sirleaf declared the country's borders to be closed; some exceptions such as Roberts International Airport remain open with the addition of screening centers there. Sirleaf also announced that football events were to be banned, schools and universities closed, and the worst-affected areas of Liberia to be placed under quarantine.

Sierra Leone On July 29 Dr. Sheik Umar Khan, who was leading Sierra Leone's fight against the epidemic, dies of the virus, the first health worker to succumb.

Liberia On July 30 Liberia shuts schools and orders the quarantining of the worst-affected communities, employing its military.

Sierra Leone On 30 July, the government allowed the deployment of troops to maintain quarantines in the country.

United States On July 31 the Peace Corps withdraws all volunteers from Liberia, Sierra Leone and Guinea, citing Ebola risks.

United Nations By the end of July, WHO statistics showed 1,603 cases and 887 deaths overall.

=== August 2014 ===
United States On August 2 an American missionary aid worker infected with EVD in Liberia, Dr. Kent Brantly, is medically evacuated to Atlanta, Georgia for treatment at Emory University Hospital.

United Nations On August 4 the World Bank announces up to $200 million in emergency assistance for Liberia, Sierra Leone and Guinea.

United States On August 5 a second infected American missionary, Nancy Writebol, is medically evacuated to Emory University Hospital.

Liberia On August 6, President Sirleaf announced that a state of emergency was to be enforced in Liberia, remarking that "certain rights and privileges" would be sacrificed in doing so.

United Nations On August 7 WHO declares the EVD epidemic a Public Health Emergency of International Concern (PHEIC).

Ivory Coast On August 11 the Ivory Coast began banning flights from neighboring Liberia.

United Nations On August 12 WHO announces that the death toll has risen above 1,000, and approves the usage of unproven drugs and vaccines.

Spain On August 12 Brother Miguel Pajares, a Catholic priest who had been medically evacuated from Liberia where he had been volunteering, dies at Hospital Carlos III in Madrid.

United Nations On August 14 WHO announces that the reports of EVD deaths and cases from the field "vastly underestimate" the scale of the outbreak.

(Switzerland) Médecins Sans Frontières On August 15 Doctors Without Borders compares the EVD epidemic to "wartime," and estimates that it will take approximately six months to bring under control.

Liberia On August 19, the West Point neighborhood of Monrovia is entirely cordoned off in an effort to halt the spread of EVD in one of the country's worst-affected areas.

Liberia On August 20 Liberian troops in Monrovia fired tear gas and live rounds at citizens attempting to break out of the quarantine of West Point, Monrovia; one adolescent dies of gunshot wounds.

United States On August 21 the two first medically evacuated cases in the US (missionaries Nancy Writebol and Kent Brantly), having been successfully treated with the experimental therapy ZMapp, are released from Emory University Hospital free of the virus. Kent Brantly's A+ type blood was later used to treat three other cases in the United States: these included the third and fifth medically evacuated cases Rick Sacra and Ashoka Mukpo as well as the second transmitted case Nina Pham.

Ivory Coast On August 21, the Ivory Coast closed its borders with both Guinea and Liberia. This action was preceded by a ban on flights between the Ivory Coast and Liberia.

(Democratic Republic of the Congo) Democratic Republic of Congo On August 24 the DRC announces an EVD outbreak in its northern Equateur province of a distinct strain from that of the larger West African outbreak.

United Kingdom On August 24 a British man (William Pooley) was evacuated from Sierra Leone to an isolation unit at the Royal Free Hospital.

Germany On August 27, a Senegalese epidemiologist who was working in Sierra Leone for the WHO was transferred to an isolation ward in Hamburg, marking the first medically evacuated case in Germany.

United Nations On August 28 WHO announces that the death toll has climbed above 1,550, and warns that the outbreak could infect more than 20,000 people. It also announces that $490 million shall be needed over the next six months.

(United States) US Also on August 28 the journal Science publishes the seminal paper Genomic surveillance elucidates Ebola virus origin and transmission during the 2014 outbreak, five of whose co-authors themselves died of EVD before publication.

Senegal On August 29 Senegal confirmed its first EVD case, in a Guinean citizen who was travelling to Dakar.

United Nations On August 30 the World Food Programme announces that it needs $70 million to feed 1.3 million people at risk in Ebola-quarantined areas.

Liberia On August 30, the quarantine of the neighborhood of West Point, Monrovia is lifted after riots on August 20.

Liberia On August 31 Liberia began denying sailors from entering or disembarking from vessels at the country's four main seaports.

United Nations By the end of August, WHO statistics showed 3,707 cases and 1,808 deaths overall.

=== September 2014 ===
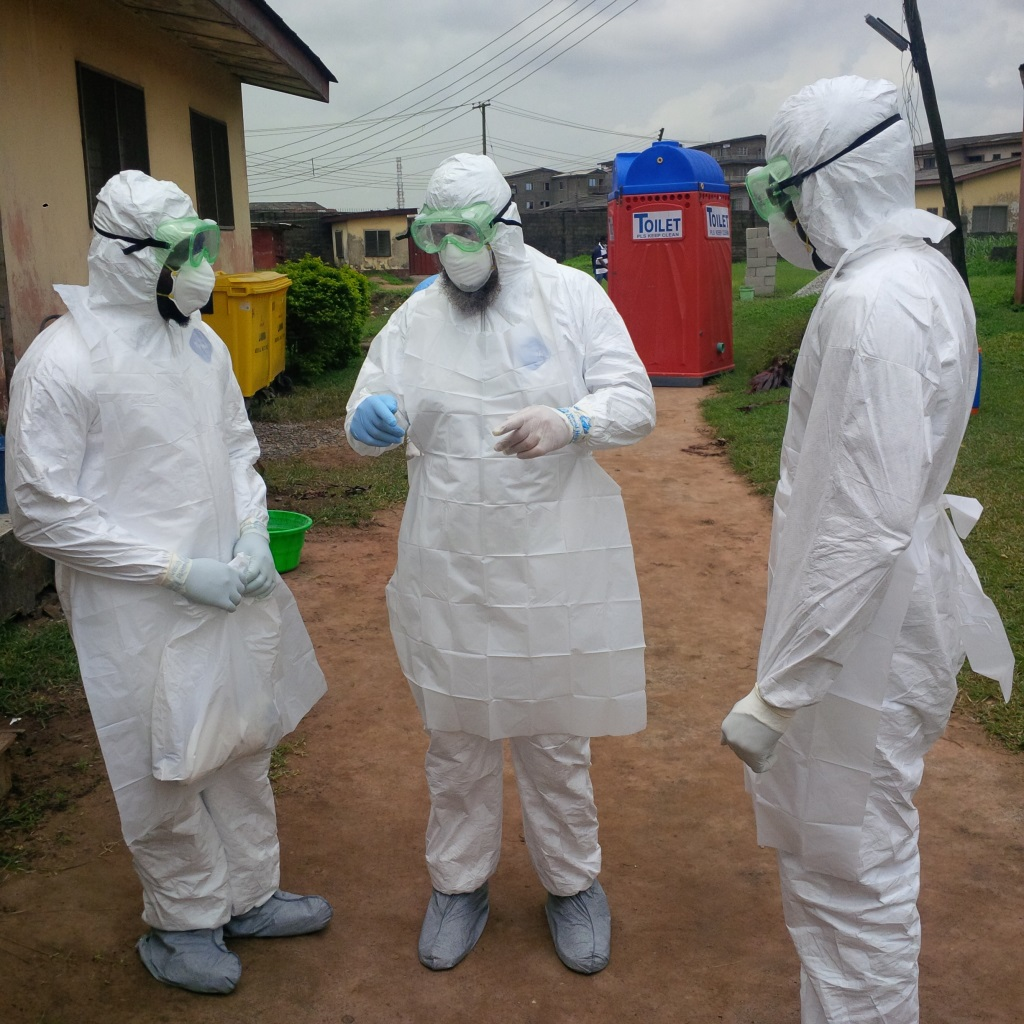
WHO training of Nigerian physicians in PPE procedures in late September

Ivory Coast On September 1 the Ivory Coast loosens its ban on travel into Liberia by opening several humanitarian corridors between the two countries.

(Switzerland) Médecins Sans Frontières On September 2 Doctors Without Borders president Joanne Liu warns the U.N. that the world is losing the battle against EVD, and harshly criticizes a "coalition of inaction." Infectious bodies are rotting in the streets in Sierra Leone, and crematoria rather than new Ebola treatment centers are being built in Liberia.

United Nations Also on September 2, the Food and Agriculture Organization (FAO) warns that the epidemic has endangered harvests and sent food prices soaring in West Africa, a problem it expects to intensify in the coming months.

United Nations On September 3 the Director-General of WHO, Margaret Chan, remarks at a Washington, D.C. press conference that the EVD epidemic was "the largest, most complex and most severe we've ever seen," and that it was racing ahead of control efforts.

United Kingdom On September 3, the patient previously being isolated at the Royal Free Hospital was released. The patient (who was identified as the British nurse William Pooley) allowed blood to be drawn to treat future patients -the fourth medically evacuated patient in the United States later received his transfusion and successfully recovered. (The transfusion may have contributed).

United States On September 4, the United States received its third medically evacuated case -a Massachusetts physician, Rick Sacra, had been working in Liberia for Serving In Mission and had performed Cesarean sections on Ebola patients before revealing symptoms. He was treated at the Nebraska Medical Center in Omaha, where he was given a blood transfusion from the first successfully recovered American patient Kent Brantly.

Liberia On September 8, the WHO reported that EVD was present in fourteen out of Liberia's fifteen counties. The remaining county without confirmed cases is Grand Gedeh County. The only county free of Ebola as of October 10 was Grand Gedeh County.

United States On September 9, a fourth patient was removed from West Africa and placed into the United States. The doctor (whose identity has not been released) was working in Sierra Leone for the WHO and had begun treatment at Emory University Hospital. In order to recover from the virus, the patient was scheduled to receive serum from the British medically evacuated case William Pooley.

Australia On September 17, Australia donated 7 million Australian Dollars to the British government, the WHO, and MSF for the purpose of aiding the countries affected by the EVD outbreak. MSF declined the offer, stating that military and medical help were more crucial to their effort than financial support.

United Nations On 18 September the UN General Assembly and the Security Council approve resolutions creating the United Nations Mission for Ebola Emergency Response (UNMEER), the first time in history the UN has created a mission for a health emergency.

Guinea Also on September 18 it is reported that eight health workers and journalists were killed by villagers in Womey, Nzérékoré Prefecture; their bodies were dumped in a septic tank. They disappeared after a riot opposed to their presence broke out—strong animosity had been directed towards health teams advising villagers about EVD previously.

France On September 19 the first French national to be infected with EVD, a volunteer nurse for Doctors Without Borders, is medically evacuated from Liberia to the Bégin military hospital on the outskirts of Paris. She later recovered and was released October 4. The death toll in West Africa is nearly 2,400.

Spain On September 21, the second medically evacuated case in Spain arrived at Madrid's Hospital Carlos III. Brother Manuel García Viejo, another Spanish citizen who was medical director at the St John of God Hospital Sierra Leone in Lunsar, had been transported to Spain from Sierra Leone after being infected with the virus.

Switzerland On September 22 a Swiss health worker was flown out from Sierra Leone to the University Hospital of Geneva after being bitten by an Ebola-infected child.

Nigeria On September 22, the WHO reported an overall total of 20 cases and 8 deaths in Nigeria. There have been no new cases since the announcement thus far, and so EVD appears to be contained there.

Liberia On September 22, a new 150-bed treatment center was opened in Monrovia, with patients arriving the day of its establishment.

United States On September 24, the first EVD case in the United States (Thomas Eric Duncan) visits the emergency room of the Presbyterian Hospital of Dallas, where he is diagnosed with a 'low-grade, common viral disease' and sent home with antibiotics.

Spain On 25 September it was announced that Brother Manuel García Viejo, the second Spanish citizen infected with the virus, had died at Madrid's Hospital Carlos III.

United States On September 25, the third medically evacuated case in the US was released from the Nebraska Medical Center after three weeks of isolation. The patient, Rick Sacra, successfully convalesced with a blood transfusion from another American case.

United Nations On September 26, the WHO announces that "The Ebola epidemic ravaging parts of West Africa is the most severe acute public health emergency seen in modern times. Never before in recorded history has a biosafety level four pathogen infected so many people so quickly, over such a broad geographical area, for so long."

United States On September 28, Thomas Eric Duncan is isolated at the Presbyterian Hospital of Dallas, where nurses Nina Pham and Amber Vinson are exposed to Duncan's vomit and bodily fluids. Both later become the second and third cases of EVD within the United States.

Ivory Coast On September 29, the Ivory Coast concluded its ban on flights from Liberia citing 'West African solidarity.'

United States On September 30 the CDC announces the first case of EVD in the Americas, in Dallas, Texas. The anonymous patient (later confirmed as Thomas Eric Duncan) is "kept in strict isolation" at Texas Health Presbyterian Hospital Dallas.

United Nations By the end of September, WHO statistics showed 7,492 cases and 3,439 deaths overall.

=== October 2014 ===
Guinea On October 2, the Governor of Conakry, Soriba Sorel Camara, decreed that all public festivities for the religious holiday of Tabaski were to be henceforth forbidden after Doctors Without Borders noted a rapid spike of admitted patients in the city.

United States On October 2, CDC hosted a Twitter chat to inform the public about Ebola.

France On October 3, Health Minister Marisol Touraine announces that the nurse evacuated from Liberia had been cured and had left hospital. She had been treated with Avigan, which had been approved by Japan in March. The death toll in West Africa is more than 3,400.

Germany On October 3, a second patient was admitted to an isolation ward in Germany. The patient is a Ugandan doctor who was working in Sierra Leone for an Italian NGO, and is currently being treated in Frankfurt's University Hospital.

On the same date, Germany both opened a 48-bed isolation center in Kenema and sent medical supplies to Liberia.

United States On October 3, a fourth case was medically evacuated to the United States; the colleagues of the patient were voluntarily isolated upon return from Liberia. The patient, Ashoka Mukpo, was a reporter for an American news network.

Germany On October 4, the Senegalese epidemiologist that was the first patient flown to and treated in Germany was released from the University Medical Center Hamburg-Eppendorf after forty days of isolation.

Norway On October 6, MSF announced that one of their workers, a Norwegian national, had become infected in Sierra Leone and was to be transported to Norway for treatment as soon as possible.

Spain On 6 October María Teresa Romero Ramos, an auxiliary nurse who had cared for Manuel García Viejo at the Hospital Carlos III, tested positive for Ebola at the Hospital Universitario Fundación Alcorcón, marking the first transmission of EVD outside of West Africa.

Liberia On October 7, Liberian Ambassador to the United States Jeremiah Sulunteh claimed Liberia may be "close to collapse" in a television interview.

United States On October 8 Thomas Eric Duncan, the first case of EVD in the U.S., dies.

Liberia On October 8, the WHO announced that EVD was present in fourteen of Liberia's fifteen counties.

France On October 9, the International Charter on Space and Major Disasters was activated by the USGS to monitor the outbreak in Sierra Leone, the first time its assorted space assets have been used in an epidemiological role.

Spain On October 10 María Teresa Romero Ramos's mixed breed dog, Excalibur, is euthanized by regional court order despite public protests due to concerns that it may have been an animal reservoir of the Ebola virus. On Twitter, the hashtag #SalvemosaExcalibur (We'll Save Excalibur) was briefly the second-most popular hashtag worldwide.

Ivory Coast On October 10, the Ivory Coast banned the sale of bush meat as part of a series of limitations designed to prevent EVD from spreading to the country. Bush meat has been generally accepted as one of the reservoirs of the virus and has been restricted temporarily in Nigeria as well.

United States On October 12, the CDC announces that a caregiver for Thomas Eric Duncan had tested positive for EVD. She is identified two days later as 29-year-old Vietnamese-American nurse Nina Pham. Pham was later moved to the National Institutes of Health in Bethesda, Maryland.

France On October 13, France pledges to build several treatment centers in Guinea while also announcing that flights from affected countries may be barred from arrival in France in the near future.

Sierra Leone On 14 October, 800 Sierra Leone peacekeepers due to relieve a contingent deployed in Somalia were placed under quarantine when one of the soldiers tested positive for Ebola.

Germany On October 14, the first patient in Germany dies from EVD, a 56-year-old Sudanese UN employee who had been the third medical evacuee to Germany, at St Georg Hospital in Leipzig.

United States On October 14 anonymous nurses allege that there were no protocols in the treatment of Thomas Eric Duncan at Texas Health Presbyterian Hospital Dallas, that their protective gear was insufficient, and that hazardous waste was allowed to pile up.

Also on October 14, Dallas Mayor Mike Rawlings announced that Nina Pham's one-year-old Cavalier King Charles Spaniel Bentley would be kept in isolation and monitored at Hensley Field.

Also on October 14, 100 members of the American military are sent to Liberia to aid efforts there -the total number of American troops in West Africa stands at 565.

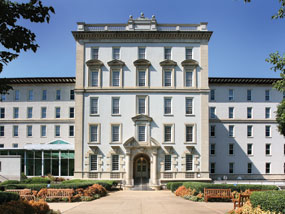
Emory University Hospital

United States On October 15 a second caregiver for Thomas Eric Duncan tests positive for EVD, 29-year-old nurse Amber Vinson. The CDC seeks to track fellow airline passengers on a flight she took from Cleveland a day before being diagnosed (her trip was itself cleared by CDC personnel). The U.S. Department of Health and Human Services announced Vinson will be transferred to Emory University Hospital in Atlanta, Georgia.

Also on October 15, concerns over Amber Vinson's presence on Frontier Airlines flights 1142 and 1143 prompts school closures (two in Solon, Ohio and three in Belton, Texas). Furthermore, two pilots and four air stewardesses are put on paid leave "out of an abundance of caution."

United Nations On October 15 the WHO announces that the death toll for EVD is 4,477, mostly in West Africa, and warns that the infection rate there could reach 5,000 to 10,000 new cases a week in two months if efforts are not stepped up.

Sierra Leone On October 16, the Emergency Operations Center announced two Ebola cases in the Koinadugu district in the far north. This marks the arrival of cases in every district in the country.

United States On October 16, the fourth medically evacuated case in the US was discharged from Emory University Hospital after being administered serum from a British patient that had successfully completed treatment at a hospital in London.

Also on October 16, a Maine elementary school teacher who had attended a conference in Dallas is put on 21-day paid leave "out of an abundance of caution." Some 135 people are being monitored in Dallas to some degree.

Spain Also on October 16, Air France flight 1300 was isolated at Barajas International Airport in Madrid after a Nigerian passenger fell ill.

Senegal On October 17, the EVD outbreak in Senegal is declared over after no new cases were reported in the country for 42 days.

Belize On 17 October refused landing of a cruise ship containing a Texas worker who handled blood samples of a now deceased Ebola patient, indicating "This decision was made out of preponderance of caution for the welfare of the citizens and residents of Belize." It also banned travel from Sierra Leone, Liberia, Guinea and Nigeria.

United Nations Also on October 17, a leaked WHO draft document admits systemic mistakes in the handling the early stages of the EVD epidemic in West Africa.

Also on October 17, the WHO officially commended Macky Sall, Awa Marie Coll-Seck, the CDC, and MSF for their work in raising public awareness of Ebola in Senegal as well as quickly and effectively preventing the spread of EVD in the country. Senegal was announced 'Ebola-free' on the same day.

(Switzerland) Médecins Sans Frontières Also on October 17, Doctors Without Borders avers that international pledges of donations have had no impact on the situation in West Africa, and that it was "ridiculous" that MSF was bearing the brunt of care.

United States Also on October 17, President Barack Obama names Ron Klain as his point man on the Ebola epidemic.

Also on October 17, several school closures in Ohio and Texas (connected with the two flights taken by Amber Vinson) by school district officials are declared by public health officials to be an overreaction. The CDC and Frontier Airlines widen their search, however, to 800 people who afterwards had boarded the same airliner (an Airbus A320, plane number N220FR) before it was taken out of service. The Airbus had flown to Atlanta, Georgia and Ft. Lauderdale, Florida, and back to Cleveland, Ohio.

Also on October 17, a crowd of parents in Hazelhurst, Mississippi pull their children from their junior high school after learning that its principal had attended a family funeral in Zambia -in southern Africa, 3,000 miles away from the epidemic in West Africa.

Egypt On October 18 Egypt delivered three tons of medical equipment to Guinea, consisting of medicine and medical equipment.

Democratic Republic of the Congo On October 18, the DRC stated it would train over 1,000 Congolese soldiers in Kinshasa to support the West African countries facing the EVD epidemic there. While facing a concurrent outbreak of its own, the DRC alluded to 'African solidarity' as a reason for its contribution.

Portugal On October 18, Portugal announced it would establish a medical base in Bissau, Guinea-Bissau to protect Guinea-Bissau from EVD in the chance that it would enter the country via neighboring Guinea.

Guinea-Bissau On October 18 Guinea-Bissau began works on an Ebola treatment center in the Hospital Simão Mendes, which is the primary medical center in the capital, Bissau. The country is bordered by Guinea and Senegal, two nations that had reported cases of EVD during the course of the outbreak.

United Nations On October 19 Tony Banbury, managing director of the recently established UN Mission for Ebola Emergency Response (UNMEER), states regarding the logistics of his operation that "I need everything. I need it everywhere. And I need it super-fast."

Spain Also on October 19 Teresa Romero, the nurse who was the first person to be infected outside of West Africa, tests negative for Ebola in an initial test. A second test is required for confirmation.

Nigeria On October 20, the WHO declared Nigeria to be Ebola-free after over six weeks without new reported cases. The final case and death count stands at 8 deaths and 20 cases.

Ghana On October 20, Ghanaian President John Mahama announces that aid is beginning to arrive at the three worst-hit countries (Guinea, Liberia and Sierra Leone).

Norway On October 21, the Norwegian national being treated in Oslo after being medically evacuated from Sierra Leone was released from the Oslo University Hospital. The woman, Silje Lehne Michalsen, responded to her discharge by stating: "For three months I saw the total absence of an international response. For three months I became more and more worried and frustrated."

United Nations On October 21 Dr. Marie Paule Kieny of the WHO announces in Geneva that a serum from the blood of recovered EVD patients could be available within weeks in Liberia, and furthermore that target date for a vaccine was January 2015.

Sierra Leone On October 21 riots broke out in the Kono district to prevent the quarantine of a 90-year-old woman suspected of having EVD; the youths are reportedly angry that there are no treatment centers in the diamond-rich Kono district. A daytime curfew is imposed.

United States On October 22, NBC freelance cameraman and medical evacuee Ashoka Mukpo is released from Nebraska Medical Center free of the Ebola virus, the second patient so treated there. Mukpo is the fifth medically evacuated case in the United States thus far.

Furthermore, DHS rules go into effect which route 100% of travellers from Liberia, Sierra Leone, and Guinea to one of five international airports for enhanced screening: JFK, Newark, Dulles, Hartsfield-Jackson, or O'Hare. (These airports had previously served 94% of such passengers arriving in the U.S.)

In addition, the CDC announced a plan to monitor for 21 days (the Ebola incubation period) all travelers arriving in the US from Guinea, Liberia or Sierra Leone, beginning on October 27. They will have to report body temperatures and symptoms daily to local and state health departments.

And finally, Nina Pham's dog, Bentley, tests negative for Ebola.

Spain Also on October 22 Teresa Romero tests negative for Ebola in a second round of tests.

Cuba Also on October 22 Cuba sends a medical team to Liberia.

Mali On October 23 the first case is confirmed in Mali, a two-year-old girl who had recently visited Guinea.

United States Also on October 23 New York City physician Craig Spencer was placed in isolation in Bellevue Hospital after experiencing symptoms of EVD. He subsequently tests positive for the Ebola virus. Spencer had returned recently from Guinea, where he had been working with Ebola patients as part of Doctors Without Borders. The diagnosis was unrelated to the cases of Ebola virus disease in Texas. Spencer completed several activities before arriving at the hospital, including riding the subway, visiting a bowling alley and entering another resident's car via Uber.

Mali On October 24 Mali reported its first death; the two-year girl who was the first confirmed case in the country died the day after her case was reported.

United States Also on October 24 the two Dallas nurses who had treated Thomas Eric Duncan and contracted EVD, Nina Pham and Amber Vinson, are declared Ebola free; the former meets President Obama in the Oval Office upon release from hospital.

Also on the 24th, New York and New Jersey establish mandatory quarantine protocols for those health care workers who have treated EVD patients who arrive from West Africa at their international airports.

North Korea Also on October 24, North Korea bars all foreign tourists.

United Nations On October 25 the WHO announces that the Ebola outbreak has passed 10,000 cases worldwide; of the 4,922 deaths, Sierra Leone, Liberia and Guinea account for all but ten.

United Kingdom Also on October 25, a paper published in The Lancet forecasts that the scale of the current international response is too slow to prevent numerous further deaths in West Africa.

United States Also on October 25, nurse Kaci Hickox, who had treated EVD patients in Sierra Leone, expresses frustration at her quarantine after her arrival at Newark International Airport the previous day under a state policy which exceeds the recommendations of the CDC.

Mauritania Also on October 25, Mauritania closes its border with Mali.

United States On October 26, Illinois Governor Pat Quinn signs an order mandating a 21-day quarantine for those who have had direct contact with EVD patients in Liberia, Guinea, or Sierra Leone.

Japan On October 27, a middle aged Canadian journalist was accosted at Tokyo International Airport upon returning from a two-month visit to Liberia and stating he had felt feverish. He was then handed to the Ministry of Health, Labour, and Welfare and was ordered to be quarantined at the National Medical Research Center in Shinjuku, Tokyo. While he was the first suspected EVD case in Asia, tests on the following day proved him negative for EVD.

Australia Also on October 27, Australia instigates visa restrictions on travellers from the three countries most affected by the Ebola epidemic.

United States On October 28 nurse Kaci Hickox is permitted to undergo quarantine at her home in Maine and leaves her hospital tent in New Jersey.

United Nations On October 29 the WHO reports that the rate of infections in Liberia has slowed, due in part in changes in cultural mortuary practices. It warns, however, that the crisis is far from over. The WHO also reports, in its tenth Ebola Roadmap Situation Report, that as of October 27, there are 13,703 EVD cases with 4,920 deaths; that all districts in Liberia and Sierra Leone are affected; and that UNMEER will have been in operation (as of October 30) for thirty days.

United States Also on October 29, a Connecticut school is sued for not allowing a seven-year-old student who had attended a wedding in Ebola-free Nigeria with her father to attend until November 3 due to "concerns" expressed by other parents and by teachers.

Also on October 29, Louisiana state health officials asked those who had treated EVD patients to not attend the annual meeting of the American Society of Tropical Medicine and Hygiene.

North Korea On October 30 North Korea imposes a mandatory 21-day quarantine on all foreign nationals arriving from abroad; furthermore, internal travel and travel abroad are even more tightly restricted.

United States Also on October 30, Science and Science Translational Medicine offer their articles on the Ebola epidemic for free for both the public and for researchers given that it is "unprecedented in terms of number of people killed and rapid geographic spread."

United States On October 31 Maine Judge Charles C. LaVerdiere ruled that nurse Kaci Hickox (who had previously gone on a defiant bicycle ride, breaking her quarantine) must continue to undergo mandatory monitoring by public health officials, but that her movements were not to be restricted inasmuch as she was asymptomatic. "The court is fully aware that people are acting out of fear and that this fear is not entirely rational,' the judge noted.

United Nations By the end of October, WHO statistics showed 13,540 cases and 4,941 deaths overall.

=== November 2014 ===
France On November 1, the second medically evacuated case was flown out of Sierra Leone to be treated in France. The patient, a United Nations employee, is not a French citizen.

United Nations On November 5 UNMEER reports that cases are surging in Sierra Leone due to the lack of treatment centers. "Two-thirds of the new cases recorded in the past three weeks have been in Sierra Leone."

United States Also on November 5 the White House requests just over $6 billion in Ebola funding from Congress.

France On November 6 France announces the screening of airline passengers arriving from Guinea.

United States On November 7 a conference is held at the White House with three leading robotics universities (Worcester Polytechnic Institute, Texas A&M, and the University of California, Berkeley) to explore the feasibility of re-purposing non-autonomous robots to further separate health care providers from possible contact with the Ebola virus. Possible roles include the removal of PPE, clinical telepresence, and the burial of the contagious dead.

(Switzerland) Médecins Sans Frontières Also on November 7, Médecins Sans Frontières / Doctors Without Borders (MSF) announces a significant decline, for reasons which are not fully understood, in Liberian cases.

United States On November 10 Dr. Spencer is declared virus-free by the New York City Health Department; he is to be released from Bellevue Hospital the next day.

United States On November 11 Dr. Spencer is released from Bellevue Hospital.

Mali On November 12, two more cases of Ebola are confirmed, both of whom died; these cases are unrelated to the case of the 2-year-old who died late October. The source of this outbreak is a Guinean imam who was treated at the Pasteur clinic in Bamako (the capital and largest city in Mali); the second case in this outbreak was a nurse at the clinic.

Liberia On November 13, Liberia ends its state of emergency.

United States On November 15 Dr. Martin Salia, a surgeon working in Sierra Leone, is medically evacuated to the Nebraska Medical Center, the third EVD case to be treated there and the most critical.

Mali Also on November 15 Mali has identified and is monitoring 256 contacts (out of as many of 343) of its second batch of EVD cases.

United States On November 17 Dr. Martin Salia dies at the Nebraska Medical Center.

Germany On November 22, Germany sends 400 specially adapted motorbikes to remote West Africa regions. The bikes are to be used for sample transport in areas that do not have a local testing laboratory.

=== December 2014 ===
Sierra Leone In early December, Sierra Leone falls behind in efforts to remove and bury the dead, with some workers dumping bodies in the streets to protest not being paid. Bodies are buried without being tested, and less than one in five dead may end up being reported to the WHO as an Ebola casualty.

United States On December 10, an American nurse exposed to Ebola while volunteering in Sierra Leone will be admitted to the National Institutes of Health Mark O. Hatfield Clinical Research Center for observation and to enroll in a clinical protocol on Thursday, December 4.

United States Also on December 10, Time magazine names The Ebola Fighters its Person of the Year.

Sierra Leone On December 12, it is announced that public Christmas and New Year's celebrations are banned. 1,319 new infections have been recorded in the last three weeks.

Guinea-Bissau On December 12, shortly after reopening its border (closed since August) with Guinea, a man with a fever was apprehended and quarantined after evading a checkpoint, along with eight other travelers he had joined. (As of eleven days later, on December 23, his name, location and condition remain unknown.)

(United Nations) On December 17, confirmed cases top 19,000.

(United Nations) On December 22, confirmed deaths exceeded 7,500.

Philippines On December 23, two returning OFWs from West Africa evaded quarantine requirements. Taking ill, they were rejected at one hospital and sent to another. (As of a week later, on December 29, their names, locations and condition remain unknown.)

United States On December 24, 2014, a CDC technician in Atlanta was potentially exposed to Ebola due to a laboratory error, and has been placed into quarantine.

United Kingdom On 29 December, Pauline Cafferkey, a healthcare worker returning from West Africa to Scotland, was diagnosed with Ebola. She was taken to a specialist treatment centre in London the next day.

(United Nations) On December 29, confirmed cases exceeded 20,000 and confirmed deaths exceeded 7,800.

Iraq On December 31, unnamed health officials in Mosul hospital allegedly maintained that Ebola had stricken "Da'ish gunmen" (ISIS jihad fighters) of African origin. The reports are not independently confirmed.

=== January 2015 ===
(United Nations) On January 3, confirmed deaths reach 8,000.

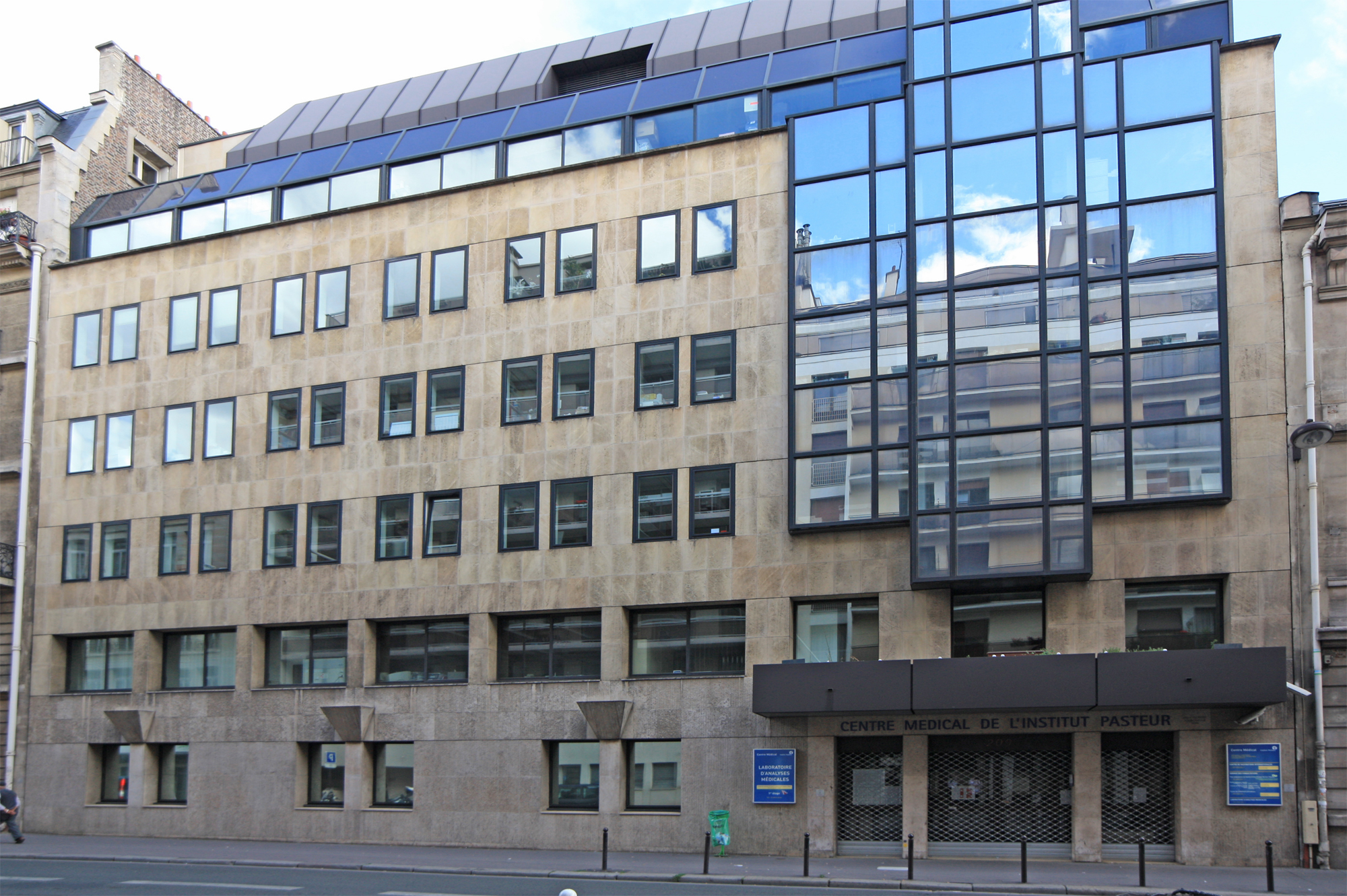
Institut Pasteur

(United Nations) On January 4, ISIS propaganda claimed several deaths due to Ebola in Mosul. The next day, the Ministry of Health of Iraq and WHO officials debunked the report as untrue.

(United Nations) On January 8, confirmed cases reach 21,000.

Mali On January 18, Mali is officially Ebola-free.

On January 21, Guinea, Sierra Leone, Liberia all reported the lowest weekly infection rates since August 2014. Guinea had re-opened its schools and universities.

On January 22, Sierra Leone has cancelled all internal quarantines citing a sharp drop of the Ebola transmission.

On January 24, Liberia has reported just 5 confirmed and 21 suspected Ebola cases across the country, indicating a likely termination of the virus transmission.

(United Nations) On January 27, confirmed cases exceed 22,000 and deaths 8,800.

(Guinea) On January 30, in France Dr. Anavaj Sakuntabhai from the Pasteur Institute has reported several asymptomatic Ebola cases, indicating a possible mutation which may enable transmission by carriers without outward signs of the disease.

=== February–November 2015 ===
(United Nations) On February 3, confirmed cases topped 22,500 and deaths reached 9,000.

(United Nations) On February 16, confirmed cases exceeded 23,000 and deaths were over 9,300.

(United Nations) On March 1, confirmed cases neared 24,000 while confirmed deaths exceeded 9,800.

On March 5, Liberia releases its last confirmed case.

(United Nations) On March 11, cases topped 24,300 while deaths surpassed 10,000.

On March 20, Liberia records its first case of Ebola in more than two weeks.

(United Nations) On April 1, cases exceeded 25,000 while deaths neared 10,500.

(United Nations) On May 1, cases were over 26,300 while deaths reached 10,900. The outbreak is nearly over in Liberia (with no new cases in weeks), is averaging ten cases per week in Sierra Leone, and is still fully out of control in Guinea with several score new cases per week.

Liberia On May 9, Liberia is officially Ebola-free.

On November 10, in Brazil a 46-year-old man coming from Guinea was suspected of Ebola and was hospitalized in Belo Horizonte, Minas Gerais.

=== January 2016 ===
On January 14, West Africa was declared Ebola-free, marking the official end of the epidemic.

== See also ==
- West African Ebola virus epidemic timeline of reported cases and deaths
