= Texas Health Presbyterian Hospital Dallas =

Teaching hospital in the United States

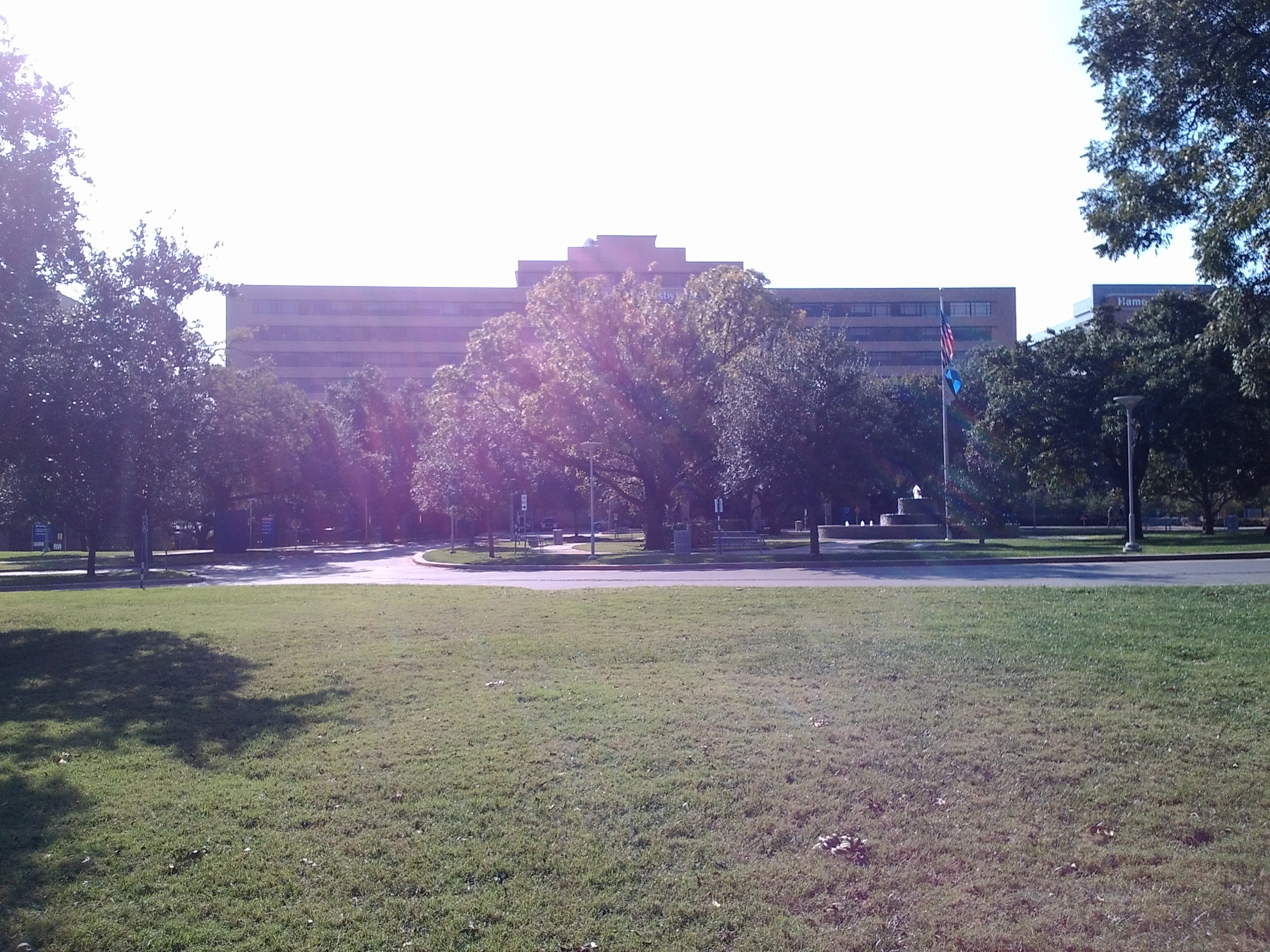

Geography
- Location: Dallas, Texas, U.S.
- Coordinates: 32.881°N 96.763°W

Organisation
- Care system: Non-Profit
- Type: General and Teaching
- Affiliated university: UT Southwestern Medical School

Services
- Emergency department: Level I Trauma Center
- Beds: 875

History
- Founded: 1966

Links
- Website: texashealth.org/dallas
- Lists: Hospitals in U.S.

Texas Health Presbyterian Hospital Dallas (often called Presby, Presbyterian, or Dallas Presbyterian) is a teaching hospital and tertiary care facility in the United States, located in the Vickery Meadow area of Dallas, Texas. It is the flagship institution of 29 hospitals in Texas Health Resources, the largest healthcare system in North Texas and one of the largest in the United States. The hospital, which opened in 1966, has 875 beds and around 1,200 physicians. The hospital is the largest business within Vickery Meadow. In 2008, the hospital implemented a program in which critical care physician specialists are available to patients in the medical and surgical intensive care units 24 hours a day, eliminating ventilator-associated pneumonia, central line infections and pressure ulcers. The hospital has maintained an active internal medicine residency training program since 1977, and hosts rotating medical students from University of Texas Southwestern Medical Center.

== Ebola virus outbreak ==
In 2014, the hospital was thrust into the national spotlight as the site of the first Ebola case diagnosed in the United States (see Ebola incident). One patient, Thomas Eric Duncan, who allegedly told healthcare workers there that he had recently traveled from Liberia, was not initially diagnosed with Ebola, but sent home. When he continued to become sicker he returned to the hospital, where his Ebola was correctly diagnosed, but he died of the disease. Two nurses who had treated this patient, Nina Pham and Amber Joy Vinson, subsequently contracted Ebola. Ms. Vinson had flown from Dallas to Ohio and back before she was diagnosed with Ebola, potentially exposing a number of other people to the disease in the meantime.

== Notable patients ==
- John McClamrock - American high school football player injured during a game and paralyzed for the remainder of his life.
- George W. Bush (43rd President of the United States) successfully received a stent here in a surgical procedure after a blockage was found in an artery during a physical examination at Dallas's Cooper Clinic.
- Greer Garson - Academy Award Winning Actress. In her final years, Garson occupied a penthouse suite at the Presbyterian Hospital in Dallas. She died there from heart failure on April 6, 1996, at the age of 91. She is interred beside her late husband in the Sparkman-Hillcrest Memorial Park Cemetery in Dallas.
- Thomas Eric Duncan - First patient diagnosed with Ebola virus disease, and first person to develop Ebola in the United States, in late September 2014. The hospital sent him home after he allegedly told them he had just been to an Ebola infected area. After he returned to the hospital and was admitted, two nurses caught Ebola from Mr. Duncan, and were treated at the hospital as well. Nurse Nina Pham, the first person to contract Ebola in the United States, was transferred to the National Institutes of Health in Bethesda, MD. Nurse Amber Joy Vinson was transferred to Emory University Hospital in Atlanta, GA. Anonymous nurses later allege that during Duncan's time of eventual treatment there had been neither established protocol to follow nor sufficient protective gear.

== In popular culture ==
Exteriors of the 1966 hospital building were used extensively in the original nighttime drama Dallas. The building represented the fictional Dallas Memorial Hospital during on location filming and in establishing shots during Seasons 2, 3 & 4 of the series which included record high rated episodes related to Who shot J.R.? storyline.
