= Devi Sridhar =

Global public health researcher

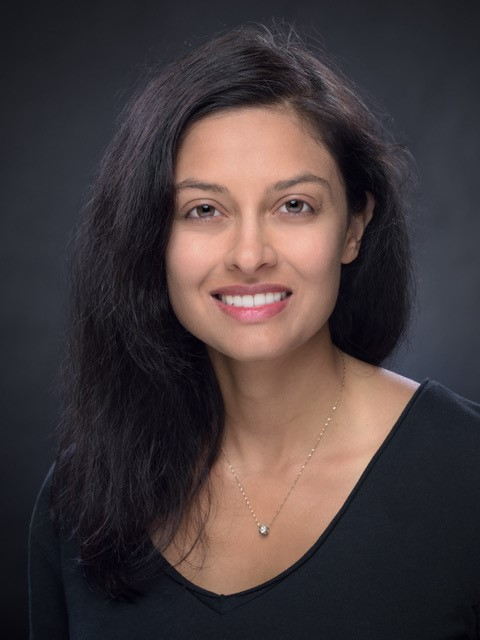
- Studio portrait, 2020
- Born: Devi Lalita Sridhar; July 1984 (age 42); Miami, Florida, U.S.
- Education: University of Miami (BS); University of Oxford (MPhil, DPhil)
- Awards: Rhodes Scholarship (2002)
- Scientific career
- Fields: Public health
- Workplaces: University of Oxford; University of Edinburgh; London School of Hygiene & Tropical Medicine
- Thesis: The art of the bank: nutrition policy and practice in India (2006)
- Doctoral advisor: David Gellner

Devi Lalita Sridhar FRSE (born 1984) is an American public health researcher, who is both professor and chair of global public health at the University of Edinburgh, Scotland. Her research considers the effectiveness of public health interventions and how to improve developmental assistance for health. Sridhar directs the University of Edinburgh's Global Health Governance Programme which she established in 2014.

Sridhar has written several books, including The Battle Against Hunger: Choice, Circumstance and the World Bank Governing Global Health: Who Runs the World and Why?, (co-written with Chelsea Clinton) and Preventable: How a Pandemic Changed the World & How to Stop the Next One. Following the West African Ebola virus epidemic, she worked with the Harvard Global Health Institute and London School of Hygiene & Tropical Medicine to assess international responses to the outbreak and use it to better inform preparations with future pandemics. In 2020, Sridhar was part of the Royal Society's Data Evaluation and Learning for Viral Epidemics (DELVE) group which influences the Scientific Advisory Group for Emergencies (SAGE) committee of the government of the United Kingdom. She also served as a member of the Scottish Government's COVID-19 advisory group set up to provide advice on how to deal with the COVID-19 pandemic in Scotland.

== Early life and education ==
Sridhar was born and raised in Miami, Florida, in an Indian family. Her father was Kasi Sridhar. After graduating from Ransom Everglades School at the age of 16, she enrolled in a six-year programme at the University of Miami that awards a bachelor's degree in two years, after which students are in the school of medicine. In an interview with The Lancet, Sridhar explained that her passion for public health stems from her adolescence in Florida, where Sridhar's father died from cancer after years of illness, "Even as a teenager I could see that health was the definition of true wealth".

Having received her bachelor's degree in biology at the age of 18, Sridhar became the youngest person in the U.S. to be awarded a Rhodes Scholarship to study at the University of Oxford. At Oxford, Sridhar completed an MPhil in medical anthropology in 2005, followed by a Doctor of Philosophy (DPhil) degree in anthropology in 2006. Her thesis analysed the effectiveness of the World Bank's effort to combat malnutrition in India. During her doctorate, she spent eight months conducting fieldwork in India into malnutrition and infectious diseases, which would inform her first book.

Sridhar turned down a funded position at Harvard Law School to join the University of Oxford Global Economic Governance Programme in 2006, where she was awarded both MPhil and DPhil degrees.

== Career and research ==
From 2008, Sridhar was a postdoctoral fellow at All Souls College, Oxford. Her doctoral research led to her first book in 2008, The Battle Against Hunger, chosen by Foreign Affairs as a must-read book in aid policy. The book investigated the World Bank funded nutrition programme based in India, which became a blueprint for aid programmes despite lack of evidence for its effectiveness. Sridhar was concerned the programme did not address the social conditions that cause undernutrition in India.

Sridhar is an Associate Fellow with the Chatham House Centre on Global Health. In 2011, she was appointed to Wolfson College, Oxford as an associate professor in global health politics. Sridhar serves on the World Economic Forum Global Agenda Council on the Health Industry. She started to research the rise of public–private partnerships in global health governance, and how, whilst they are crucial to combat infectious disease, their non-transparent accountability and effectiveness should be investigated. International organisations are redirected by specific incentives, and the asymmetry of information sharing between member states and groups like the World Health Organization (WHO) or World Bank limits their impact. She worked with Chelsea Clinton and used principal agent theory to study the Global Fund to Fight AIDS, Tuberculosis and Malaria and the GAVI alliance. She worked with Julio Frenk on the need for an independent and impartial World Health Organization.

Between 2014 and 2016, Sridhar was on the board of trustees of Save the Children. She regularly contributes to The Guardian, BBC World Service, CNN, Channel 4 News, and BBC Radio 4. She is a member of Iyiola Solanke's Black Professors Forum.

=== Ebola and assessing responses to pandemics ===
Sridhar and colleagues investigated the international response to the West African Ebola virus epidemic, and what reforms were needed to heal a global system for outbreak response. She partnered with the Harvard Global Health Institute and London School of Hygiene & Tropical Medicine to independently analyse the global response. They raised questions for the next director general of the WHO and recommended ten essential reforms to prevent and respond to the next pandemic.

In 2014, Sridhar was appointed reader and senior lecturer in Global Public Health at the University of Edinburgh. The following year she was promoted to full professor. While at Edinburgh, Sridhar established the Global Health Governance Programme and is the Founding Director. She works between the University of Edinburgh Medical School and Oxford's Blavatnik School of Government. Sridhar compiled the first Wellcome Trust open research collection on the topic of global public health. She is concerned by the rise of chronic disease, drug-resistant infection and funding for primary healthcare.

While at the Blavatnik School of Government, Sridhar analysed the reach, effectiveness, and interdependency of supranational agencies like WHO, other UN health agencies, and organisations such as Gavi, The Vaccine Alliance and the World Bank. "The aim was to better understand the strengths and weaknesses of these organisations, and their comparative advantages and relevance to health ministries, especially in low-income and middle-income countries", she explained, in an interview with The Lancet. This work informed her 2017 book, co-authored with Chelsea Clinton, Governing Global Health: Who Runs the World and Why? In the book, Sridhar and Clinton argue that health governance is global and that global institutions are necessary to protect citizens and improve health outcomes on a broad scale. In addition, global health governance is changing, with increasing recognition of the need for intergovernmental cooperation to combat health problems. The book examined the work of four key organisations, the WHO; the World Bank; The Global Fund to Fight AIDS, Tuberculosis and Malaria; and GAVI. A key point made is the recent phenomenon of public-private partnerships in global health, a discussion of how these came about and some of the effects of such relationships. A review by Margaret K. Saunders in the journal Health Affairs noted that the book "provides an in-depth picture of the history of these global institutions and, more importantly, shows what that history means for the future of global health."

=== 2020 Coronavirus policy ===
At a 2018 Hay Festival event, Sridhar warned of the risk of infectious disease from animal-to-human transmission travelling to the UK from China, saying "Our biggest health challenges are interconnected."

On 28 March 2020, The Lancet published a letter signed by Sridhar and 35 other professors, criticising the UK's secretive approach to the COVID-19 pandemic, saying "we request that the government urgently and openly shares the scientific evidence, data, and models it is using to inform current decision making related to COVID-19 public health interventions ... With the UK increasingly becoming an outlier globally in terms of its minimal social distancing population-level interventions, transparency is key to retaining the understanding, cooperation and trust of the scientific and healthcare communities as well as the general public, ultimately leading to a reduction of morbidity and mortality."

In April 2020, the Royal Society established its DELVE (Data Evaluation and Learning for Viral Epidemics) group, whose membership included Nobel laureates Venki Ramakrishnan and Daniel Kahneman as well as Sridhar. In addition to advising the UK's SAGE team, this group has published data-driven research on coronavirus disease 2019, including a paper in The Lancet, whose recommendations were summed up in The Guardian by Sridhar as 1) Test, trace, and isolate 2) Give public health guidance on avoiding the virus and 3) Control borders to prevent reimportation. Sridhar similarly in April told an interviewer from The Times that "The virus is basically here to stay ... [Testing] seems like the way to preserve your economy as much as possible."

Also in April, Sridhar was added to the Scottish Government's "time limited expert group," set up on 25 March 2020, to help develop and improve its plan for handling the COVID-19 pandemic in Scotland. The group is chaired by Edinburgh University professor Andrew Morris. She is also (since June) a member of its subgroup on Education and Children's Issues.

Sridhar praised the resulting Scottish government strategy to deal with the pandemic, a strategy whose goals are 1) "to reduce exposure" and 2) "to keep daily new cases as low as possible." Sridhar also repeatedly contrasted the Scottish Government's response to the pandemic in Scotland to the strategy used by the British Government in managing the COVID-19 pandemic in England:

Devi Sridhar, who runs the global health governance program at the University of Edinburgh, noted that the two countries took radically different approaches from the start: England's priority was to prevent its hospitals from being overrun, while Scotland's was to drive cases down to zero. If not for imported cases from the south, Dr. Sridhar said, Scotland could come close to that goal by the end of the summer.

— Mark Landler, The New York Times (10 July 2020)

During the summer of 2020 Scotland recorded the third highest death toll in Europe. Despite this, many journalists praised the apparent success of Scotland's "zero covid" policy, by comparison to the British government response to the COVID-19 pandemic. Sridhar co-authored an article that appeared in the BMJ in July, describing and praising "Scotland's slow and steady approach."

In August, Sridhar wrote a New York Times op-ed titled "We Will Pay for Our Summer Vacations With Winter Lockdowns," which was a reflection on the role of tourism and travel in community transmission of the virus, urging "strict border measures" for European countries to contain the coronavirus. Noting the different coronavirus rates in Scotland and in Northern Ireland versus in England and in Wales she expressed concern that Scotland and Northern Ireland both "face a stream of incoming infections from England and Wales." The "stream of incoming infections" comment has been criticised by Scottish unionists and others, with Willie Rennie, leader of the Scottish Liberal Democrats, accusing Sridhar of "feeding a divisive nationalist narrative without scientific evidence to back it up." Nicola Sturgeon said that Sridhar's comments were "not political" and a "perfectly legitimate public health point". The Scottish Government said Sridhar "was independent" and "did not speak on its behalf."

In December, sequencing by the COVID-19 Genomics UK Consortium indicated that Scotland had almost eliminated the first strains of COVID-19 over the summer, and that travel and holidays abroad had re-seeded the newest strains and the second wave. One of the evolutionary genetics researchers, Thomas Christie from the University of Edinburgh, noted that 'the second wave of COVID-19 in Scotland was caused by new strains of the virus brought in from abroad and other parts of the UK'.

Sridhar co-authored an open letter in The Lancet (15 October 2020) that has been referred to as the John Snow Memorandum. The letter, which calls for science-based public health policy and rejects "naturally acquired herd immunity" as a dangerous fallacy, received 2000 signatures from the science and healthcare community within 24 hours.

=== Awards and honours ===
At the University of Edinburgh Sridhar won the Chancellor's Rising Star award in 2017. She won the Fletcher of Saltoun award of the Saltire Society for contributions to science in 2020.

In 2021, The Royal Society of Edinburgh (RSE) included Sridhar on its list of new fellows, the citation stating that "Professor Sridhar, whose research considers the effectiveness of public health interventions, has become a household name in the last 12 months as a public health expert during the coronavirus pandemic."

=== Selected publications ===
Sridhar serves on the editorial board of the journal Public Health. She also writes a regular column in The Guardian, and did a special collection on "The World Bank and financing global health" in the British Medical Journal (BMJ).

Sridhar's books include:

- Sridhar, D. (2008), The Battle Against Hunger: Choice, Circumstance and the World Bank (Oxford: Oxford University Press)
- Sridhar, D. (2008), Anthropologists Inside Organisations: South Asian Case Studies (Thousand Oaks, CA: SAGE Publications)
- Sridhar, D. (2014), Healthy Ideas: Improving Global Health and Development in the 21st Century (Edinburgh: Edinburgh University Press)
- Clinton, C. and Sridhar, D. (2017), Governing Global Health: Who Runs the World and Why? (Oxford: Oxford University Press)
- Sridhar, D. (2022), Preventable: How a Pandemic Changed the World & How to Stop the Next One Hardcover (Penguin/Viking)
- Sridhar, D. (2025), How Not to Die (Too Soon): The Lies We've Been Sold and the Policies That Can Save Us (Penguin)
