= Prevention =

Prevention or Prevent may refer to:

== Health and medicine ==
- Preventive healthcare, measures to prevent diseases or injuries rather than curing them or treating their symptoms

== General safety ==
- Crime prevention, the attempt to reduce deter crime and criminals
- Disaster prevention, measures taken to prevent and provide protection for disasters
- Pollution prevention in the US, activities that reduce the amount of pollution generated by a process
- Preventive maintenance, maintenance performed to prevent faults from occurring or developing into major defects
- Prevent strategy, a scheme in the UK to report radicalisation
- Risk prevention, reducing the potential of loss from a given action, activity and/or inaction
- Risk management, the identification, assessment, and prioritization of risks in business

== Other uses ==
- Prevention (magazine), an American healthy lifestyle magazine
- Prevention (album), a 2009 album by the Scottish indie rock band De Rosa
- Prevent defense, an American football defensive alignment
- Prevention First, a nonprofit organization supporting drug-free communities through public education
- Prevent (British government programme), part of the CONTEST anti-terror defence in the UK

== See also ==
- Preventive Medicine (journal), a peer-reviewed medical journal
- Prevention paradox, the situation where the majority of cases of a disease come from a population at low risk
- Prevention science, the application of a scientific methodology to prevent or moderate major human dysfunctions
- Prevention through design, the concept of mitigating occupational hazards by "designing them out"
- Preventable (book), a 2022 book by Devi Sridhar
