= Preston Hollow Elementary School =

Public school in Texas, United States

Location
- 6423 Walnut Hill Lane; Dallas, Texas 75230; 32.880575°N 96.795486°W

Information
- Type: Public, Primary
- School district: Dallas Independent School District
- Principal: Tom Brandt
- Grades: PK–5
- Enrollment: 452
- Colors: hunter green and white
- Mascot: patriot
- Information: +1 (972) 794-8500; Fax: +1 (972) 794-8501
- Trustee dist.: 2, Jack Lowe
- Area: 4, Dr. Robin S. Ryan
- Website: http://www.dallasisd.org/prestonhollow

Preston Hollow Elementary School is a public primary school in the Preston Hollow area of north Dallas, Texas. Preston Hollow Elementary School enrolls students in grades pre-kindergarten–5 and is a part of the Dallas Independent School District.

The school is located within the Preston Hollow North subdivision. The school serves homes within the homeowner associations of Glen Lakes, Lane Park, Preston Hollow North, Sorento, and Windsor Park. It also serves The Meadows Neighborhood Association and a portion of the Caruth Hills Home Place Neighborhood Association.

In 2006 the school lost a civil lawsuit over a plan to group White students into the same classes and over-classify Hispanic students as English as a second language (ESL) learners in order to group Anglo White students in the same classes.

== History ==
In 1987 Preston Hollow Elementary School parents stated that they wanted a voluntary busing program established so the school could attract racial and ethnic minorities. During the same year Preston Hollow participated in a Save the Children Foundation school to school partnership with the village school of N'Dimi, Cameroon. It was the first Dallas school to do a Save the Children Foundation partnership.

In 1989 the DISD board proposed the re-opening of Arthur Kramer Elementary School. Under the plan, portions of the attendance boundaries of Pershing, Preston Hollow, and Rogers would have been modified. In 1991 the Kramer, Pershing, and Preston Hollow schools had a combined total of 32 portable buildings to house excess students. Parents from those schools supported plans to re-open Hotchkiss Elementary School as a neighborhood school, so it could house excess students. In 1992 federal judge Barefoot Sanders blocked the plan. The president of the Preston Hollow parent-teacher association (PTA), Terri Piacenti, criticized Sanders' decision. Hotchkiss opened as a neighborhood school in 1994. Glenna Taite, a specialist from DISD who analyzed enrollment data, stated that many North Dallas apartments saw population increases because previously singles and couples only apartments were required by law to open housing to families in 1989, so the area saw a surge in families.

In 1999 the PHES had almost 200% of the number of students that it was designated to house. In 2000 the E.D. Walker Math, Science and Technology Vanguard opened, taking some students from Preston Hollow.

In August 2006 Jack Lowe Sr. Elementary opened, relieving Preston Hollow. Lowe opened, the section of Lakewood Elementary School's boundary that was within Vickery Meadow became a part of Lowe's boundary; therefore Preston Hollow no longer served any sections of Vickery Meadow. As of 2000 PHES had at least 20 portable buildings used to house the excess students.

=== Class-assignment policy controversy ===
In 2006, Preston Hollow Elementary School achieved notoriety after a lawsuit claiming the school's class-assignment policies violated the 1954 Supreme Court Brown v. Board of Education decision. Judge Sam Lindsay ruled in November that the school's practices were not legal because they attempted to keep white students together even if minority students had to be placed in inappropriate courses; this ruling was mis-cited in at least one local paper as indicating that all-white classes had been created.

Prior to the lawsuit the Hispanic Preston Hollow parents had formed the Organización Para el Futuro de los Estudiantes (OFE, "Organization for the Future of the Students" in Spanish). The Mexican American Legal Defense and Educational Fund (MALDEF) represented the plaintiff parents. Defense noted that not a single whites-only class existed in the school, and that placement was based on test scores; however, Latino claimants in the suit argued that their children were placed in bilingual or English as a Second Language classes even when test scores suggested they should be in a general education program. Richard R. Valencia, the attorney arguing for the plaintiffs, argued that the segregation had no pedagogical basis.

The district's attorneys also argued that no harm had been caused to the minority students, prompting the judge to write, "The court is baffled that in this day and age, that [DISD relied] on what is, essentially, a 'separate but equal' argument." The policies were criticized in the judge's ruling and in subsequent news articles as being an attempt to lessen white flight by attracting more parents from the surrounding, mostly white community to keep their children in the local public system rather than sending them to private schools. The duration of the bench trial was from August 9, 2006 to August 21, 2006.

The school and the president of the school's Parent Teacher Association, Meg Bittner, were also called to task for development and use of a promotional brochure that – according to the suit and to e-mails from Bittner introduced into evidence – intentionally featured almost exclusively white children, despite the school's enrollment being predominately minority. The ruling was affirmed by Lindsay in April 2007, following his granting of a motion to amend a finding regarding the date on which the principal, Teresa Parker, had announced the planned ending of the special class assignments; the judge stated that this detail had not affected the decision and also denied defense motions to amend the conclusion of the judge's opinion and to amend the punitive damages assessed against Parker. The judge criticized both motions as follows:

The court finds troubling that Defendants would attempt to retreat and recharacterize their 'separate but equal' arguments, and it insults the court's intelligence that they seek to reclassify these arguments in any other manner. [Regarding the motion to reduce the punitive damages] The flip side of the coin can be argued, that is, that the punitive damages awarded ... are too low when one considers the purposes of such damages – to punish those who act with evil intent, or with reckless or callous indifference to another's constitutional rights, and to deter others from engaging in such illegal conduct. ... The court can think of no constitutional violations more damaging and indelible than those based on immutable characteristics, such as race and ethnicity at issue in this case.

The judge ruled that the school was "in effect, operating at taxpayers' expense, a private school for Anglo children within a public school that was predominately minority."

Parker initially retained her position despite the court's having found her personally liable for violation of the 14th Amendment with regard to specific children. News stories near the January 17, 2007, deadline for implementation of policy changes reported that Parker had been moved to an administrative position with the school district and the principalship would be taken over by interim principal Enid Rosenfeldt.

=== Post-controversy ===
In 2013 the percentage of White students was 7.9% and the percentage of economically disadvantaged was 85.9%, compared to the 19% and 75.9% in 2007. In 2013 DISD board trustees were taking steps to add an International Baccalaureate program to Preston Hollow.

== Statistics ==
77% of the students at Preston Hollow are classified as economically disadvantaged, 8% enroll in special education, 13% enroll in gifted and talent programs, and 42% are considered "limited English proficient."

The ethnic makeup of the school is 66% Hispanic American, 18% White American, non-Hispanic, 13% African American and 3% Asian American/Pacific Islander American.

The average class sizes at Preston Hollow are 17 for Kindergarten, 12 for 2nd grade, 15 for 3rd grade, 22 for 4th grade, and 30 for 5th grade.

Teachers at the school carry, on average, 16 years of teaching experience and 0% of the teachers on staff are first-year teachers.

== Neighborhoods served ==
The PHES attendance zone mainly consists of areas north of the Northwest Highway, south of Royal Lane, east of Preston Road, and west of the North Central Expressway. Housing within the attendance zone includes single-family houses with wealthy white residents, several middle class houses, and apartment complexes which are mostly minority. PHES serves a portion of Preston Hollow.

== School uniforms ==
All DISD elementary school students , including Preston Hollow students, are required to wear school uniforms.

The Texas Education Agency specified that the parents and/or guardians of students zoned to a school with uniforms may apply for a waiver to opt out of the uniform policy so their children do not have to wear the uniform; parents must specify "bona fide" reasons, such as religious reasons or philosophical objections.

== Feeder patterns ==
As of 2008, Preston Hollow feeds into Benjamin Franklin Middle School and ultimately into Hillcrest High School.

== Notable alumni ==
- Barrett Brown (journalist, essayist, involved with Anonymous)
- Barbara and Jenna Bush – Twin daughters of U.S. President George W. Bush; Laura Bush served on Preston Hollow's PTA while Barbara and Jenna attended Preston Hollow
