= Preventable (book) =

2022 book by Devi Sridhar

Preventable: How a Pandemic Changed the World & How to Stop the Next One
- Author: Devi Sridhar
- Language: English
- Genre: Non-fiction
- Published: Viking Press 2022
- Publication place: UK
- Pages: 432
- ISBN: 978-0241510537

Preventable: How a Pandemic Changed the World & How to Stop the Next One is a 2022 memoir about the COVD-19 pandemic by Devi Sridhar. The book documents the pandemic from the author's perspective as an advisor to the Scottish and UK governments, with criticism of the latter. Preventable was met with positive critical reception, noted for humanizing the pandemic and the author's accessible style.

== Publication ==
Preventable was written by Devi Sridhar, the chair of global health at Edinburgh University. It was published by Viking Press in 2022.

== Synopsis ==
Preventable covers the first eighteen months of the COVID-19 pandemic. The first chapter focuses on the origin of the virus and notes the Chinese government's reluctance to allow an investigation of the origins of the virus, documenting Sridhar's open-mindedness around the COVID-19 lab leak theory.

The book compares COVID-19 variants and their relative transmissibility. It compares pandemic responses internationally, contrasting governmental responses in China, South Korea, Vietnam, Senegal, Sweden, New Zealand, and Australia. It notes "over-confidence" from high income country government responses and critiques the tendency for high income countries to over-procure stocks of vaccines.

In Preventable, Sridhar notes how Nicola Sturgeon was more willing to take her advice than Boris Johnson, whose activities are compared to Jair Bolsonaro's and Donald Trump's. Critique of Johnson continues, noting his absence at COBRA meetings and his decision visit COVID-19-positive patients in a hospital. The book is also critical of the UK's Scientific Advisory Group for Emergencies for their groupthink, their adoption of a herd immunity strategy, and their incorrect pessimism around the speed at which an effective vaccine could be produced.

In the book, Sridhar discusses the online harassment she has received and Twitter doxing attempts. She also writes about catching COVID-19.

The book suggests what could be done better in the next pandemic, which is described as inevitable.

== Critical reception ==
Preventable is noted for being easily accessible, praised for humanising the story of the pandemic, and is described by Elsa Maishman in The Scotsman as the most readable of all recent COVID-19 pandemic memoirs.

Sridhar's predictions are described as "prescient" and her analysis as "scathing" by Oliver Barns, writing in the Financial Times.

== See also ==
- COVID-19 pandemic in the United Kingdom
