= Thomas Eric Duncan =

First Ebola patient diagnosed in the United States

- Born: December 30, 1973; Monrovia, Liberia
- Died: October 8, 2014 (aged 41); Dallas, Texas, United States
- Cause of death: Ebola virus disease
- Occupation: Personal driver
- Known for: First diagnosis of Ebola virus disease in North America
- Children: Karsiah Eric Duncan

Thomas Eric Duncan (December 30, 1972 – October 8, 2014) was a Liberian citizen who became the first Ebola patient diagnosed in the United States on September 30, 2014. Duncan, who had been visiting family in Dallas, was treated at Texas Health Presbyterian Hospital Dallas. By October 4, his condition had deteriorated from "serious but stable" to "critical". On October 8, he died of Ebola. Two health care workers became infected with Ebola virus, 26-year-old nurse Nina Pham and 29-year-old nurse Amber Vinson, both of whom had taken care of him at Texas Health Presbyterian Hospital (THPH).

The family eventually threatened to sue the hospital based on the claim that Duncan had not received proper and timely care. The family was thus able to receive compensation from THPH. On November 10, 2014, Duncan's family reached a "resolution" with THPH that included the hospital covering the expenses related to Duncan's intensive and onerous treatment, as well as an undisclosed amount cash payment to the family.

== Background ==
Duncan was from Monrovia, Liberia, to date the country hit hardest by the Ebola virus epidemic. He worked as a personal driver for the general manager of Safeway Cargo, a FedEx contractor in Liberia. According to manager Henry Brunson, Duncan had abruptly quit his job on September 4, 2014, giving no reason.

== Contraction of Ebola ==
=== Timeline of contraction and initial symptoms ===
On September 15, 2014, the family of Marthalene Williams, who later died of Ebola virus disease, could not call an ambulance to transfer the pregnant Williams to a hospital. Duncan, their tenant, helped to transfer Williams by taxi to an Ebola treatment ward in Monrovia. Duncan rode in the taxi to the treatment ward with Williams, her father and her brother.

On September 19, Duncan went to Monrovia Airport, where, according to Liberian officials, he lied about his history of contact with the disease on an airport questionnaire before boarding a Brussels Airlines flight to Brussels. In Brussels, he boarded United Airlines Flight 951 to Washington Dulles Airport. From Dulles, he boarded United Airlines Flight 822 to Dallas/Fort Worth. He arrived in Dallas at 7:01 p.m. CDT on September 20, 2014, and stayed with his partner and her five children, who lived in the Fair Oaks apartment complex in the Vickery Meadow neighborhood of Dallas. Vickery Meadow, the neighborhood in Dallas where Duncan lived, has a large African immigrant population and is Dallas's densest neighborhood.

==== Duncan's illness in Dallas ====
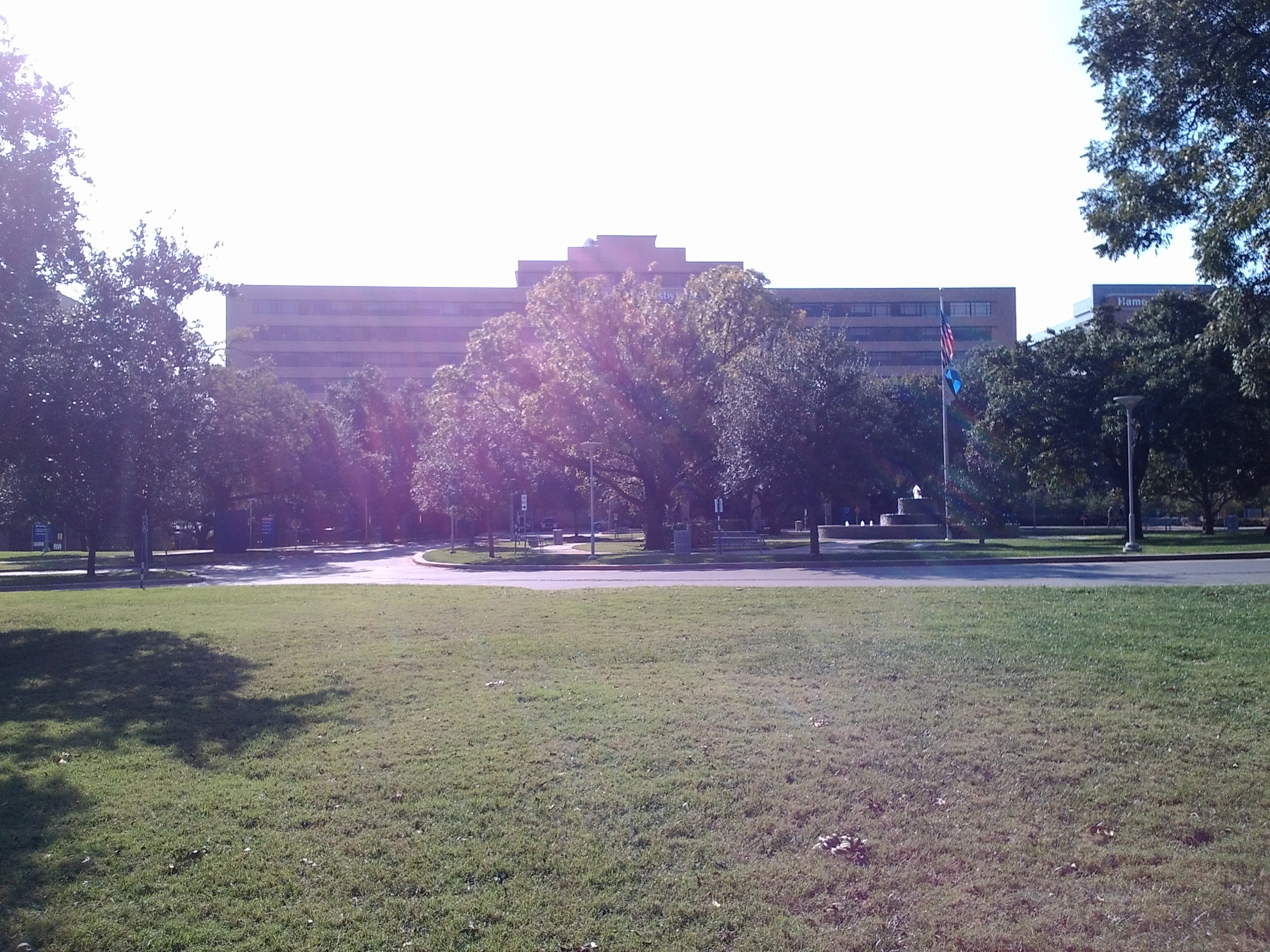
Texas Health Presbyterian Hospital, where Duncan was treated

Duncan began experiencing symptoms on September 24, 2014, and arrived at the Texas Health Presbyterian Hospital emergency room at 10:37 p.m. on September 25. At 11:36 p.m., a triage nurse asked him about his symptoms, and he reported feeling "abdominal pain, dizziness, nausea and headache (new onset)". The nurse recorded a fever of 100.1 °F (37.8 °C), but did not inquire as to his travel history as this was not triage protocol at the time. At 12:05 a.m., Duncan was admitted into a treatment area room where the on-duty physician accessed the electronic health record (EHR). The physician noted nasal congestion, a runny nose, and abdominal tenderness. Duncan was given paracetamol (acetaminophen) at 1:24 a.m. CT scan results came back noting "no acute disease" for the abdominal and pelvic areas and "unremarkable" for the head. Lab results returned showing slightly low white blood cells, low platelets, increased creatinine, and elevated levels of the liver enzyme AST. His temperature was noted at 103.0 °F (39.4 °C) at 3:02 a.m. and 101.2 °F (38.4 °C) at 3:32 a.m. Duncan was diagnosed with sinusitis and abdominal pain and sent home at 3:37 a.m. with a prescription for antibiotics, which are not effective for treating viral diseases.

=== Treatment and death ===
What we're seeing now is not an "outbreak" or an "epidemic" of Ebola in America. This is a serious disease, but we can't give in to hysteria or fear. – President Barack Obama on the Ebola outbreak

Duncan's condition worsened, and he was transported on September 28 to the same Texas Health Presbyterian Hospital emergency room by ambulance. He arrived in the emergency room at 10:07 a.m., experiencing diarrhea, abdominal pain, and fever. Within fifteen minutes, a doctor noted that Duncan had recently come from Liberia and needed to be tested for Ebola. The doctor described following "strict [CDC] protocol" including wearing a mask, gown, and gloves. At 12:58 p.m., the doctor called the CDC directly. By 9:40 p.m., Duncan was experiencing explosive diarrhea and projectile vomiting. At 8:28 a.m. the next morning, the doctor noted that he "appeared to be deteriorating". By 11:32 a.m., he was severely fatigued, enough to prevent him from using the bedside toilet. Later that day, he was transferred to an intensive care unit (ICU) after all other patients had been evacuated. The next day, September 30, he was diagnosed with Ebola virus disease after a positive test result.

Duncan's diagnosis was publicly confirmed during a CDC news conference the same day. Duncan died at 7:51 am on October 8, 2014.

=== Connected cases ===
On the night of October 10, Nina Pham, a 26-year-old nurse who had treated Duncan at Texas Health Presbyterian Hospital, reported a low-grade fever and was placed in isolation. On October 11, she tested positive for Ebola virus, becoming the first person to contract the virus in the U.S. On October 12, the CDC confirmed the positive test results. Hospital officials said Pham had worn the recommended protective gear when treating Duncan on his second visit to the hospital and had "extensive contact" with him on "multiple occasions".

Pham claimed that "she doubts whether she can ever be a critical care nurse again – in part because of the emotional stress and anxiety over the trauma she experienced and in part because of the fear and stigma that follows her". She sued the hospital and settled for an undisclosed amount of money.

On October 14, a second nurse at the same hospital, identified as 29-year-old Amber Joy Vinson, reported a fever. Vinson was among the nurses who had provided treatment for Duncan. Vinson was isolated within 90 minutes of reporting the fever. By the next day, Vinson had tested positive for Ebola virus. On October 13, Vinson had flown Frontier Airlines Flight 1143 from Cleveland to Dallas, after spending the weekend in Tallmadge and Akron, Ohio.

== Reactions ==
On October 2, Liberian authorities said they could prosecute Duncan if he returned because before flying he had filled out a form in which he had falsely stated he had not come into contact with an Ebola case. Liberian President Ellen Johnson Sirleaf told the Canadian Broadcasting Corporation she was angry with Duncan for what he had done, especially given how much the United States was doing to help tackle the crisis: "One of our compatriots didn't take due care, and so, he's gone there and in a way put some Americans in a state of fear, and put them at some risk, and so I feel very saddened by that and very angry with him. ... The fact that he knew (he might be a carrier) and he left the country is unpardonable, quite frankly." Before his death, Duncan brazenly claimed that he did not know at the time of boarding the flight that he had been exposed to Ebola; he said he believed the woman he helped was having a miscarriage, which contradicts corroborated accounts from family members who also helped transport the woman to an Ebola ward.

Duncan's family said the care Duncan received was at best "incompetent" and at worst "racially motivated". Family members threatened legal action against the hospital where Duncan received treatment. In response, Texas Health Presbyterian Hospital issued a statement, "Our care team provided Mr. Duncan with the same high level of attention and care that would be given any patient, regardless of nationality or ability to pay for care. We have a long history of treating a multicultural community in this area."

== See also ==
- Index case
