= Vickery Meadow, Dallas =

Neighborhood in Dallas, Texas

Coordinates: 32.875°N 96.759°W

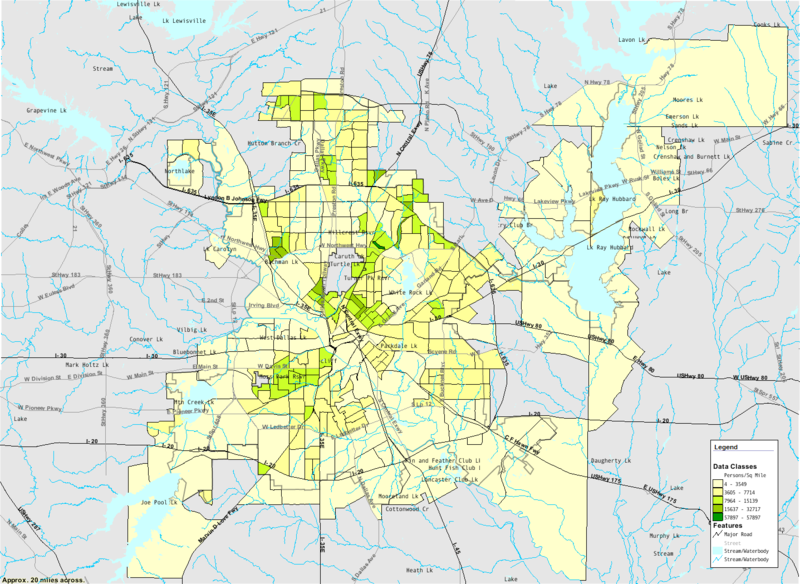
Population density map per Census 2000. Vickery Meadow is the darkest green, northwest of White Rock Lake.

Vickery is an ethnically-diverse neighborhood consisting almost exclusively of apartment complexes in Northeast Dallas, Texas, United States. The Midtown Improvement District states the neighborhood is bounded by Northwest Highway, Royal Lane, Central Expressway, and Abrams. The City of Dallas Office of Economic Development states that the boundaries of the Vickery Meadow Tax Increment Financing district, which was established in 2005, are “the east side of the intersection of US 75 (Central Expressway) and Park Lane and extends eastward along Park Lane to the ‘Five Points’ intersection at Park Lane, Fair Oaks Avenue and Ridgecrest Road.” Leslie Minora of the Dallas Observer described it as "a dense swath of about 100 apartment complexes cradled by NorthPark Center and Whole Foods to the west and Half Price books [sic] to the south. It's an overlooked anthill, population 25,000, packed with people here by circumstance."

The area is one of the most densely populated areas of Dallas and is home to many immigrants and refugees. The area was originally developed to provide housing for childless, upper-income people in the mid-1970s. The area was built out in the early 1980s. With the passage of the Fair Housing Act in 1968, the demographics shifted to a mostly low income, immigrant population from Latin America and other countries around the world. During that time, area public schools began to become overcrowded. The school district responded by opening new schools in the area, including one high school, one middle school, and several elementary schools; some apartment complexes were razed to make room for new schools. The Midtown Improvement District (MID), a public improvement district, serves the Vickery area.

In 2014 the Dallas City Council member representing Vickery, Jennifer Staubach Gates, referred to it as "kind of the melting pot of America".

== History ==
Vickery was at a site that is now on Loop 12, State Highway 75, Interstate Highway 635, the Southern Pacific line, and the Missouri, Kansas and Texas line in north central Dallas County. It was located on the original land grants of W. Jenkins, D. Barrow, N. McGraney, and W. P. Wyche. The area was originally settled by John J. and William Jenkins in the 1850s, and a small settlement began to develop around the Jenkins homes. The Houston and Texas Central Railway built through the community in 1873, but by 1900 it was still a small settlement of a few scattered houses. In the early 1900s before World War I, John E. Vickery laid out and promoted a townsite, which received a post office in 1912. Ten years later the community had 200 residents, six food and drug stores, four automobile repair shops, three churches, a bank, a cotton gin, a dining hall, and a public school. It had no water or fire department facilities. The population of Vickery fluctuated between a high of 800 in 1927 to a low of 200 in 1933. By 1939 the number of residents had increased to 650, and by 1941, to 1,000. Dallas annexed the community in March 1945. (Source: Texas State History On Line)

The area was developed as multifamily residences that provided housing for an influx of people to the Dallas area that began in the 1970s. When it was fully built out, Vickery had 15,500 apartments and 2,300 condos in an area of 2.86 square miles.

Many of these residents were described by Michael E. Young of The Dallas Morning News as "young, hip, and reasonably well off." They reportedly planned to stay in Vickery for a short time before buying houses in the Dallas suburbs.

In 1988, the U.S. federal government passed the Fair Housing Act, which, under most circumstances, prohibits any policy that excludes families with children from living in an apartment complex. The passage of the act— which forced the complexes to admit children— and a rental market recession, caused a decrease in rent prices and a shift in the area's demographics throughout the 1990s. Immigrants and refugees from Mexico, Central America, Bosnia, Burma, Bhutan, and parts of Africa moved into the apartment complexes. The infrastructure that existed was largely not designed for families. The Midtown Improvement District, a coalition of the property owners, opened in 1993 to improve the quality of life of area residents and stabilize the area real property and real property investments. In 2004, Casie Pierce, the executive director of the Vickery Meadow Public Improvement District, argued in an editorial in The Dallas Morning News that Vickery ought to be redeveloped into modern urban renewal.

In October 2014 Thomas Eric Duncan, a Liberian who lived in the vicinity of Vickery, contracted ebola as part of an epidemic. Vickery residents stated that people were discriminating against them because of the incident.

== Government and infrastructure ==
Vickery is within the Northeast Division of the Dallas Police Department, which is headquartered at 9915 East Northwest Highway; sectors 210 and 240 cover portions of Vickery. Vickery is in the service area of Fire Station 37 of the Dallas Fire Department; the station opened in 1954 to serve the community of Vickery, then a rural area. Two city council districts, 9 and 13, serve sections of Vickery. As of 2008 the representatives of the districts are Sheffie Kadane and Mitchell Rasansky, respectively. In 2005, the City of Dallas established the Vickery Midtown Tax Increment Financing (TIF) District to improve the real estate market and encourage economic development in its area. It is located on the east side of Park Lane, extending from U.S. Route 75 (Central Expressway) to the "Five Points" intersection.

The Midtown Improvement District was established in 1993. In 1998, 2003, 2008 and 2023, the district was renewed. Midtown Dallas Inc operates the district.

Vickery is located in District 114 of the Texas House of Representatives. As of 2023 John Bryant represents the district. Vickery is within District 16 of the Texas Senate; as of 2023 Nathan M. Johnson represents that district. Vickery is in Texas's 32nd congressional district; as of 2023 Colin Allred represents the district.

The area's transit authority, Dallas Area Rapid Transit, manages public transport in Vickery. Bus routes through the area include 17, 20, 27, and 402. The Walnut Hill and Park Lane stations of the Red Line and Orange Line also serve Vickery Meadow. The Parkland Health & Hospital System (Dallas County Hospital District) operates the Vickery Health Center.

== Cityscape ==
The Midtown Improvement District includes 11,929 multi-family units, 110 businesses, and five schools of the Dallas Independent School District.

== Demographics ==
Vickery is the most densely populated community in Dallas, and some of its residents are immigrants and refugees. Vickery Meadow attracts refugees because of its inexpensive housing, access to health care facilities, and public transportation. The greater Midtown area, consisting of 5.3 square miles (14 km^{2}) of land, including open parkland, had around 53,000 residents by 2004. The core Vickery Meadow area, known as the Midtown Improvement District and consisting of 2.86 square miles (7.4 km^{2}), had 40,646 people. Of the population, 5,303 were under 6 years old, 3,932 were ages 6 through 13, 1,670 were ages 14–17, 27,555 were ages 18–64, and 2,186 were 65 or older. 39% of the people were considered to be in poverty. The average residency period was less than five years. Of the population about 40% were Hispanic or Latino, 32% were White, 22% were African-American, and 6% were other groups, mostly including immigrants from sub-Saharan Africa. The Vickery Midtown Improvement District said that the true Hispanic and Latino population may be higher due to illegal immigration.

In 2004 Vickery had 14,860 housing units, including 12,558 apartment units, 2,300 condominium units, and two single-family houses. A total of 102 multi-family residential properties existed in Vickery Meadow, with the smallest having six housing units and the largest having 1,084 housing units.

== Education ==
=== Primary and secondary schools ===
Hillcrest High School serves a small section of Vickery Meadow

The Dallas Independent School District operates schools serving Vickery. Five DISD schools are located in the Midtown Improvement District.

Elementary schools serving Vickery and within the PID include Jack Lowe, Sr. Elementary School, Lee A. McShan, Jr. Elementary School, and Jill Stone Elementary School at Vickery Meadow. Other elementary schools serving Vickery Meadow include L. L. Hotchkiss Elementary School and Dan D. Rogers Elementary School.

Sam Tasby Middle School and Emmett J. Conrad High School serve most of Vickery, and are both within the improvement district. A small portion of Vickery is zoned to Benjamin Franklin Middle School and Hillcrest High School.

Stone Elementary includes two main buildings, with one including the administrative offices, the media center, and several classrooms and the other including common areas and public function facilities, and modular classroom buildings with individual telephone and toilet facilities. The two story main Stone building has outdoor stairwells and faces an inner courtyard. Jayne Noble Suhler of The Dallas Morning News said "[i]n a neighborhood of apartments, [Stone Elementary] fits right in[...]"

McShan, located on an 8.2-acre (33,000 m^{2}) site, includes 89,666 square feet (8,330.2 m^{2}) of space with 33 core classrooms, three special education classrooms, dedicated classrooms for art, science, and technology classes, a 400-seat auditorium, and a gymnasium. Lowe has 89,000 square feet (8,300 m^{2}) of space with 34 classrooms. Tasby has 166,000 square feet (15,400 m^{2}) of space with 26 core classrooms. Tasby and Lowe share a single campus and several common areas; the two schools have their designated entrances in the school building.

==== History of schools ====
In the 1990s the population of Vickery's children increased. Therefore, the student population at the public schools increased, requiring the building of new campuses. The Vickery Meadow Improvement District Improvement District and Dallas ISD worked together to build new campuses.

In 1991 Dallas ISD officials proposed that Hotchkiss Elementary School reopen as a neighborhood school during the 1992-1993 school year. The Montessori program previously at Hotchkiss would be moved to Dealey Elementary School. The proposed attendance zone for Hotchkiss was a triangular area bounded by Fair Oaks Avenue, Northwest Highway, and White Rock Creek. The proposed Hotchkiss neighborhood would relieve Kramer, Pershing, Preston Hollow, and Dan D. Rogers schools. In 1992 federal judge Barefoot Sanders blocked the reopening of Hotchkiss, so school board members filed an appeal with the 5th U.S. Circuit Court of Appeals.

In 1994 Hotchkiss re-opened as a neighborhood school. The school expected to receive 875 students; it actually received almost 925. The school had to use 17 portable classrooms, and two classrooms had to be converted into food storage rooms. Judy Zimny, the principal of Hotchkiss, said that most of the students came from the apartments in the Abrams Road, Northwest Highway, and Skillman Road area. The school was 42% black, 38% Hispanic, and 20% White. The school is located within what was then a mostly-White residential neighborhood, but in 1994 most of the White students to Hotchkiss were bussed in from other locations. About 100 students from other areas were voluntarily enrolled in Hotchkiss so Hotchkiss's racial demographics were more balanced.

In a 1998 journal article by American School & University, Michael Brown, the executive director of Dallas ISD's facilities planning department said that the bond program did not have sufficient funds for a new school. The district took money from the general operating fund, which would be reimbursed after the following bond program would be passed. Vickery Meadow Elementary School opened as the first school in Vickery Meadow; in 2005 it was renamed Jill Stone Elementary School at Vickery Meadow. When it opened, Vickery Meadow Elementary took in 400 students. Previously students who were bussed to other campuses in the Dallas area were now able to walk to their zoned schools. As of 1998, all students at Vickery Meadow Elementary were immersed in completely English classes for eight weeks before being placed in bilingual or ESL classes. The district anticipated that the school would be 75% Hispanic.

In the 2000s four apartment complexes were demolished to make room for four schools. In 2005 Lee McShan Elementary School, built with $12 million as part of a 2002 bond program, opened with pre-Kindergarten–sixth grade students; the sixth grade would be transferred to the middle school the following year. In August 2006 Lowe Elementary, built with $12 million, opened with kindergarten–fifth grade, relieving Hexter, L.L. Hotchkiss, Kramer, Robert E. Lee (now Geneva Heights), Preston Hollow, and Dan D. Rogers elementary schools. During the same year Tasby and Conrad opened. Tasby, built with $20 million, relieved Franklin Middle School. The lot which Tasby and Lowe occupied used to be The Villas at Vickery, a retail and residential complex built in 1976. Before the openings of the Tasby and Conrad schools, Benjamin Franklin Middle School and Hillcrest High School had the zoning for most of Vickery Meadow. Other portions were zoned to Bryan Adams High School and Hill Middle School. Before Lowe opened, Hexter, Lakewood, and Preston Hollow elementary schools served sections of Vickery Meadow. The areas that were zoned to Hexter and Lakewood were rezoned to Hotchkiss, and the areas zoned to Preston Hollow were rezoned to Lowe.

=== Community colleges ===
Dallas College, the Dallas County Community College District operates area community colleges. The closest campus to Vickery is Richland College in Dallas.

=== Public libraries ===
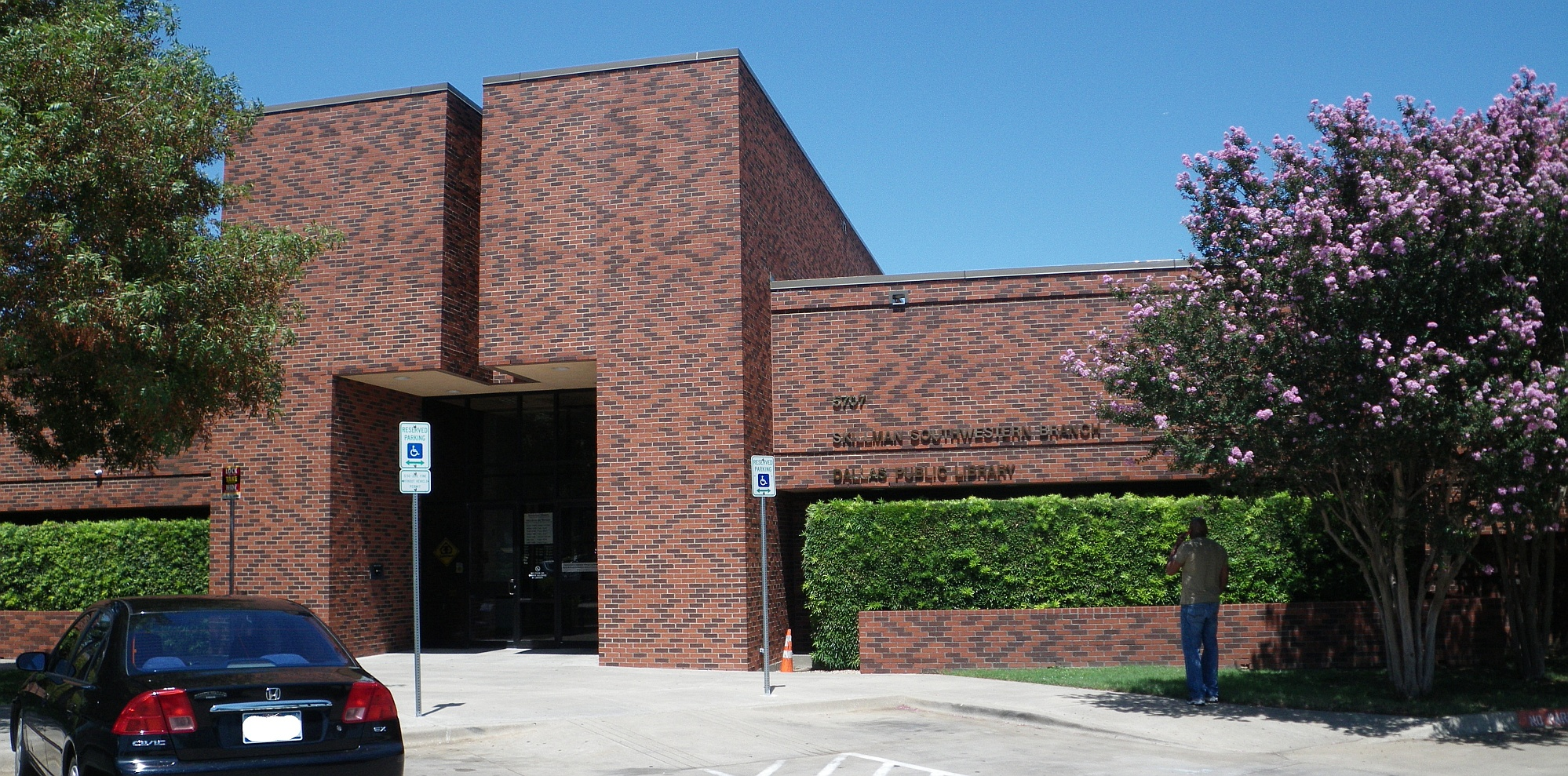
Skillman Southwestern Library

Vickery Park Library

Vickery Park Branch public library opened in 2021 at 8383 Park Lane in the Dallas Public Library system. Vickery Park is community center for education, culture and special events for youth and families.

==== Skillman Southwestern ====
The Skillman Southwestern Branch Library of the Dallas Public Library, at 5707 Skillman Street at Southwestern Boulevard, is south of and serves Vickery. The library opened in July 1996 and received dedication on August 18, 1996. A 1978 bond authorized by Dallas voters lead to the construction of the Skillman Southwestern library. Ramiro Salazar, then the director of the Dallas library system said in 1996 that the opening of Skillman Southwestern satisfied "the needs of a community that didn't have an accessible library for a long time."

== Non-profit organizations ==
In 1997 the Preston Hollow Presbyterian Church started Literacy Achieves (formerly Vickery Meadow Learning Center) as a 501(c)(3) non-profit organization. The program originally consisted of English-language classes taught in various locations throughout the community. The program gained its own property in 1999 and established early education classes in 2002. As of 2008 the learning center, open to Vickery Meadow residents, offers English classes for adults and pre-Kindergarten children and citizenship classes for no charge.

Love Is Vickery Ministry, started in 2009, is a Christian ministry affiliated with the American Missionary Fellowship. Programs include a computer lab for skills training, ESL classes, after school tutoring, new family assistance and a youth summer soccer league. All of the programs are offered free of charge, made possible through volunteers and donations from various churches.

Heart House Dallas, founded in 2000, is a non profit organization that runs a free afterschool educational program that provides a safe haven and academic support to at-risk children, while encouraging them to become good citizens. Heart House Dallas works primarily in the Vickery neighborhood and serves children in grades K-8 from various apartment communities.

== Health care ==
Texas Health Hospital is located in Vickery. The hospital, which opened in 1966, has 866 beds and around 1,200 physicians. The hospital is the largest business within Vickery.

Many other medical and healthcare businesses are located in Vickery and in the Medical Business District of Midtown Improvement District, at complexes including Woodhill, Pecan Creek and in office buildings at the corners of Greenville Avenue and Walnut Hill.

== Economy ==
The Half Price Books flagship store is located in Vickery. It is housed in a warehouse and includes a small coffee shop and sitting areas. Various events happen all year round such as group meetups, live musicians, game nights, author talks, and more. It is pet friendly.

Chili's, a popular American restaurant chain, was founded in the Vickery Meadows area of Dallas, Texas. The first Chili's location opened in 1975 in a converted postal station on Greenville Avenue. This original restaurant quickly became a local favorite, offering a casual dining experience with a focus on hamburgers and Tex-Mex cuisine. The success of this initial establishment in Vickery Meadows paved the way for Chili's expansion into a global chain, with the neighborhood holding a special place in the company's history as its birthplace.
