= Anavaj Sakuntabhai =

Thai human geneticist

- Born: October 11, 1962 (age 63)
- Education: Chulalongkorn University, University of Oxford
- Title: Head of Functional Genetics of Infectious Diseases Unit
- Scientific career
- Fields: Infectious diseases, malaria, dengue, dermatology, darrier disease
- Workplaces: Institut Pasteur, Paris, France

Anavaj Sakuntabhai (Thai: อนวัช ศกุนตาภัย) is a researcher specialising in human genetics of infectious diseases, notably malaria and dengue.

== Career ==
Anavaj Sakuntabhai began his career as a medical doctor, graduating in 1987. He obtained his PhD in human molecular genetics from the University of Oxford in 1999.

In 2000 he joined the Institut Pasteur as a senior scientist and in 2007 became the leader of the laboratory of Genetics of Human Response to Infections. In 2010 he created and became a head of the Functional Genetics of Infectious Diseases Unit.

For several years, he was a principal investigator of one of the four consortial projects of the MalariaGEN consortium, a global community of researchers working together to integrate epidemiology with genome science financed by the Bill & Melinda Gates Foundation.

He is a partner of a Wellcome Trust financed project on the human genome wide screening for dengue susceptible genes. His laboratory is a principal investigator of a French initiative to tackle the disease burden under changing environments. He is a coordinator of the European FP7 project on Dengue Framework for Resisting Epidemics in Europe (DENFREE). The project aims to find key factors determining dengue transmission and dengue epidemics in order to develop new tools and strategies for controlling dengue transmission. The project also estimates the risk of spreading DENV to uninfected areas, especially in Southern Europe where susceptible vectors exist.

Sakuntabhai coordinates a global network for dengue research in the Institut Pasteur International Network.

== Research ==
In 1999 Sakuntabhai discovered a gene responsible for Darrier disease, a monogenic skin disorder. In 2005 he discovered a variant on a promoter of DC-SIGN associated with gene expression and outcome of dengue infection. Since its discovery this variant has been shown to be associated with other infectious diseases including tuberculosis and HIV, amongst others. It has been confirmed in a replicated study.

In 2009, together with other researchers, he participated in the finding of positive selection of G6PD (glucose 6 phosphate dehydrogenase) and its effect on Plasmodium vivax (one of the six species of malaria parasites that commonly infect humans) density. The work challenges the former belief that G6PD mutations were selected by P. falciparum and highlights the significant effect of P. vivax on human health, one hitherto neglected.

His recent research has shown that both gene-gene and gene-environmental interactions play a significant role in susceptibility to malaria and dengue.

== Selected publications ==
- Grange L, Simon-Loriere E, Sakuntabhai A, Gresh L, Paul R, Harris E. http://journal.frontiersin.org/Journal/10.3389/fimmu.2014.00280/abstract Front Immunol. 2014 Jun 11;5:280. doi: 10.3389/fimmu.2014.00280. eCollection 2014. Review.
- Khor, CC; Chau, TN; Pang, J; Davila, S; Long, HT; Ong, RT; Dunstan, SJ; Wills, B; Farrar, J; Van Tram, T; Gan, TT; Binh, NT; Tri; Lien; Tuan, NM; Tham, NT; Lanh, MN; Nguyet, NM; Hieu, NT; Van, N Vinh Chau N; Thuy, TT; Tan, DE; Sakuntabhai, A; Teo, YY; Hibberd, ML; Simmons, CP (2011). "Genome-wide association study identifies susceptibility loci for dengue shock syndrome at MICB and PLCE1". Nat. Genet. 43 (11): 1139–41. doi:10.1038/ng.960. PMC 3223402. PMID 22001756.
- Louicharoen, C; Patin, E; Paul, R; Nuchprayoon, I; Witoonpanich, B; Peerapittayamongkol, C; Casademont, I; Sura, T; Laird, NM; Singhasivanon, P; Quintana-Murci, L; Sakuntabhai, A. P (Dec 2009). "Positively Selected G6PD-Mahidol Mutation Reduces Plasmodium vivax Density in Southeast Asians" (PDF). Science. 326 (5959): 1546–9. Bibcode:2009Sci...326.1546L. doi:10.1126/science.1178849. PMID 20007901. S2CID 26646963.
- Jallow M, Teo YY, Small KS, Rockett KA, Deloukas P, Clark TG, Kivinen K, Bojang KA, Conway DJ, Pinder M, Sirugo G, Sisay-Joof F, Usen S, Auburn S, Bumpstead SJ, Campino S, Coffey A, Dunham A, Fry AE, Green A, Gwilliam R, Hunt SE, Inouye M, Jeffreys AE, Mendy A, Palotie A, Potter S, Ragoussis J, Rogers J, Rowlands K, Somaskantharajah E, Whittaker P, Widden C, Donnelly P, Howie B, Marchini J, Morris A, Sanjoaquin M, Achidi EA, Agbenyega T, Allen A, Amodu O, Corran P, Djimde A, Dolo A, Doumbo OK, Drakeley C, Dunstan S, Evans J, Farrar J, Fernando D, Hien TT, Horstmann RD, Ibrahim M, Karunaweera N, Kokwaro G, Koram KA, Lemnge M, Makani J, Marsh K, Michon P, Modiano D, Molyneux ME, Mueller I, Parker M, Peshu N, Plowe CV, Puijalon O, Reeder J, Reyburn H, Riley EM, Sakuntabhai A, Singhasivanon P, Sirima S, Tall A, Taylor TE, Thera M, Troye-Blomberg M, Williams TN, Wilson M, Kwiatkowski DP; Wellcome Trust Case Control Consortium; Malaria Genomic Epidemiology Network. http://www.nature.com/ng/journal/v41/n6/full/ng.388.html. Nat Genet. 2009 May 24.
- Ndiaye, R; Sakuntabhai, A; Casademont, I; Rogier, C; Tall, A; Trape, JF; Spiegel, A; Dieye, A; Julier, C (May 2005). "Genetic study of ICAM1 in clinical malaria in Senegal". Tissue Antigens. 65 (5): 474–80. doi:10.1111/j.1399-0039.2005.00388.x. PMID 15853902.
- Sakuntabhai, A; Turbpaiboon, C; Casademont, I; Chuansumrit, A; Lowhnoo, T; Kajaste-Rudnitski, A; Kalayanarooj, SM; Tangnararatchakit, K; Tangthawornchaikul, N; Vasanawathana, S; Chaiyaratana, W; Yenchitsomanus, PT; Suriyaphol, P; Avirutnan, P; Chokephaibulkit, K; Matsuda, F; Yoksan, S; Jacob, Y; Lathrop, GM; Malasit, P; Despres, P; Julier, C (May 2005). "A variant in the CD209 promoter is associated with severity of dengue disease". Nat Genet. 37 (5): 507–13. doi:10.1038/ng1550. PMC 7096904. PMID 15838506.
- Hirunsatit, R; Kongruttanachok, N; Shotelersuk, K; Supiyaphun, P; Voravud, N; Sakuntabhai, A; Mutirangura, A (Jan 2003). "Polymeric immunoglobulin receptor polymorphisms and risk of nasopharyngeal cancer". BMC Genet. 4 (1): 3. doi:10.1186/1471-2156-4-3. PMC 149362. PMID 12546713.
- Sakuntabhai, A; Ruiz-Perez, V; Carter, S; Jacobsen, N; Burge, S; Monk, S; Melanie, S; Munro, CS; O'Donovan, M; Kucherlapati, R; Owen, M; Lathrop, GM; Monaco, AP; Strachan, T; Hovnanian, A (1999). "Mutations in ATP2A2, encoding a Ca2+ pump, cause Darier disease". Nature Genetics. 21 (3): 271–7. doi:10.1038/6784. PMID 10080178. S2CID 38684482.
