= Emory University Hospital =

Teaching hospital in Atlanta, Georgia

Coordinates: 33°47′30″N 84°19′11.7″W

- Emory Healthcare
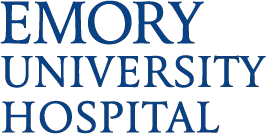

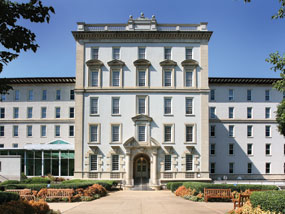
- Emory University Hospital Front Entrance in 2012

Geography
- Location: Atlanta, Georgia, USA

Organisation
- Type: Teaching
- Affiliated university: Emory University

Services
- Beds: 853 licensed beds

History
- Founded: 1904

Links
- Website: emoryhealthcare.org/locations/hospitals/emory-university-hospital
- Lists: Hospitals in Georgia

Emory University Hospital is an 853-bed hospital in Atlanta, Georgia, specializing in the care of acutely ill adults. Emory University Hospital is staffed exclusively by Emory University School of Medicine faculty who also are members of The Emory Clinic. The hospital is renowned as one of the nation's leaders in cardiology and cardiac surgery, oncology, transplantation, ophthalmology, and the neurosciences.

== History ==
Emory University Hospital's history dates back over a century. In March 1904, its predecessor, Wesley Memorial Hospital, was chartered with 50 beds. The hospital was housed in a downtown Atlanta mansion that had been spared from destruction by General Sherman's army during the Civil War.

By November 1922, the hospital had grown too large for its quarters and moved to its current DeKalb County site on the Emory University campus. The new 275-bed facility was a gift of Asa G. Candler, philanthropist and founder of The Coca-Cola Company.

In the mid-1930s, its name was changed to Emory University Hospital. The university and the hospital bear the name of Bishop John Emory, who presided at a meeting of the Georgia Methodist Conference in 1834 when delegates decided to establish a Methodist college in Georgia.

The City of Atlanta annexed Emory University effective January 1, 2018. Prior to the annexation, the hospital was in an unincorporated area, statistically in the Druid Hills census-designated place.

== General description ==
Emory University Hospital is a 853-bed facility specializing in the care of the acutely ill adult. The hospital is located on the Emory University campus in northeast Atlanta. More than 24,000 inpatients and 80,000 outpatients come to Emory University Hospital each year. They receive care from physicians of The Emory Clinic, who also are faculty of the Emory University School of Medicine, and from a highly trained staff of nurses and other clinical professionals.

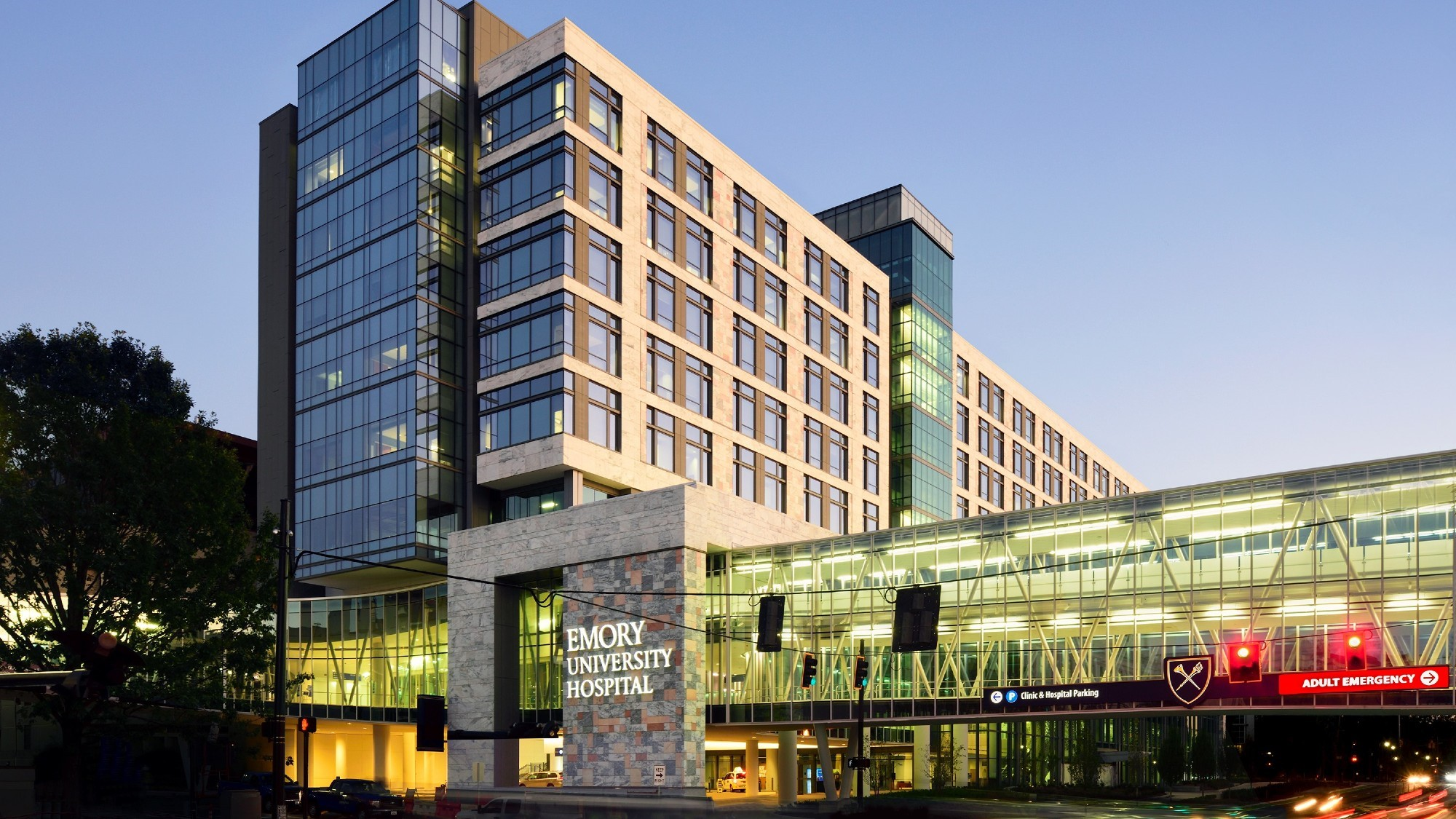
Emory University Hospital

The hospital provides a full range of specialized care. News and World Report's "America's Best Hospitals" for several years as one of the nation's top 10 cardiology centers.The latest data show it has 23,710 admissions and performs 9,446 inpatient and 2,843 outpatient surgeries. Its emergency room has 30,476 visits. Located in Atlanta, GA, it is accredited by the Joint Commission, Commission on Accreditation of Rehabilitation Facilities (CARF). It is also a teaching hospital.

== Rankings ==
On the U.S. News's "America's Best Hospitals", 2010–11, Emory University Hospital was ranked in 11 adult specialties. Out of 4,852 facilities analyzed for the 2010-11 Best Hospitals rankings, only 152 were ranked in any of the 16 specialties and this hospital was one of them.

== 2014 West Africa Ebola outbreak ==
On July 31, 2014, the United States government and the Centers for Disease Control announced that Emory Hospital would treat at least one of the patients of the 2014 West Africa Ebola outbreak in a specialized isolation facility. Brantly was released August 21, 2014 with Dr. Bruce Ribner, director of Emory's Infectious Disease Unit, declaring that Brantly "… has recovered from the Ebola virus disease and he can return to his family, to his community, and to his life without any public health concerns". In his statement, Brantly reported that Writebol had been released two days earlier (on August 19). Brantly and Writebol were the first patients ever to be treated with the experimental drug ZMapp, splitting a dose between both patients; Samaritan's Purse later reported Brantly's condition began to improve within hours of receiving the treatment, although they point out that it is unclear if either the treatment or a blood transfusion, received in Africa from a young Ebola survivor, was responsible for the improvement.

On October 15, the U.S. Department of Health and Human Services announced that Amber Vinson, the second case of Ebola transmission in the U.S., would be transferred to Emory. Vinson has since recovered from the disease and been declared Ebola-free.
