= National Crime Scene Cleanup Association =

American sanitation company

National Crime Scene Cleanup
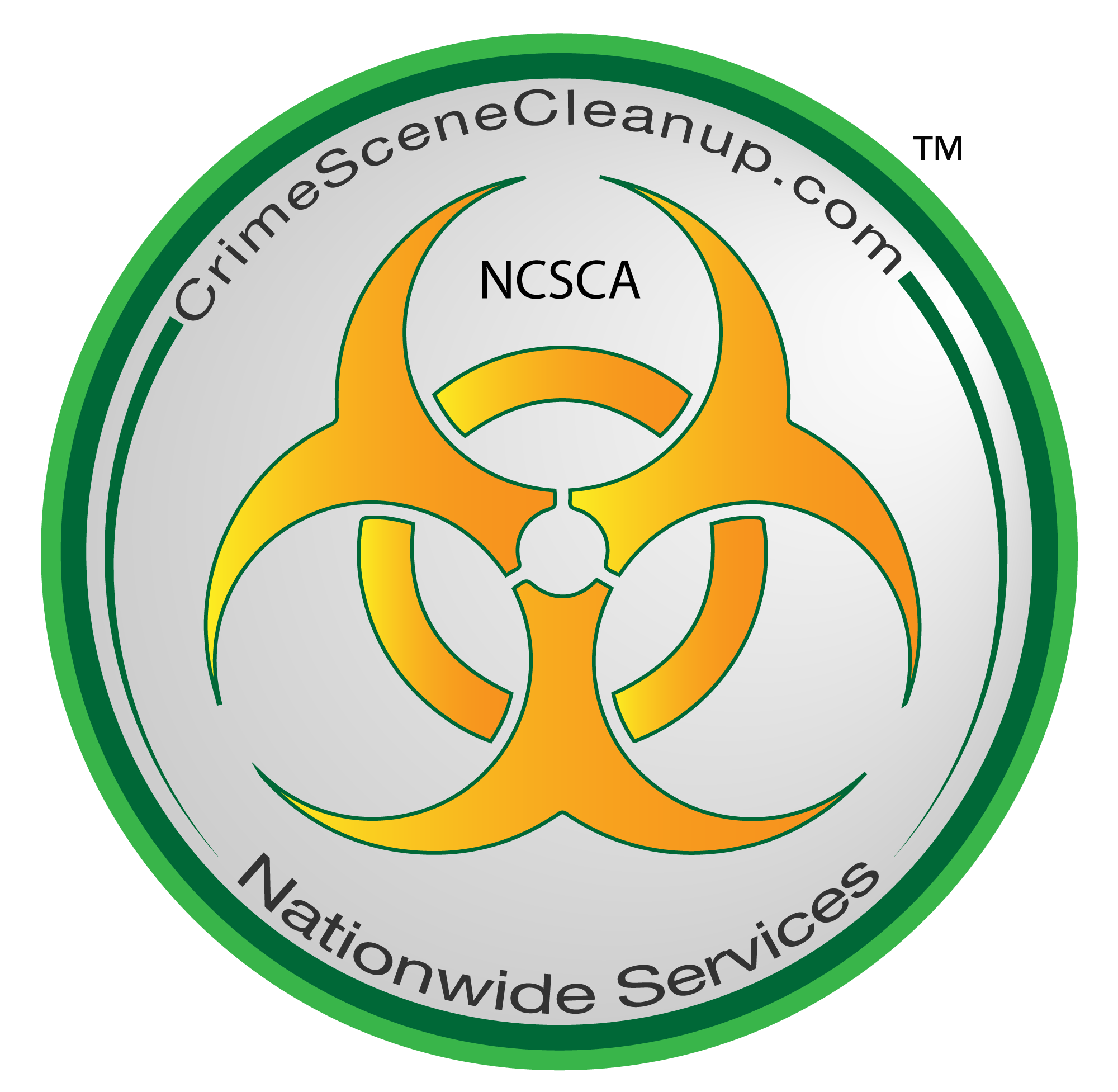
- Type: Private
- Industry: Crime scene cleanup
- Headquarters: Patchogue, New York
- Area served: Contiguous United States
- Brands: NCSCA
- Services: Crime Scene Cleanup; Suicide Cleanup; Hoarding Cleanup; Blood Cleanup; Unattended Death Cleanup; Mold Remediation; Asbestos Abatement; Bio-Hazardous Waste Removal
- Parent: Prestige Worldwide ind corp
- Website: www.crimescenecleanup.com

The National Crime Scene Cleanup Association (also commonly referred to as NCSCA) is an American company, owned by Prestige Worldwide Ind Corp., that provides crime scene cleanup, hoarding cleanup training, trauma cleanup training, unattended death cleanup training, as well as various types of remediation service training, such as mold, tear gas, or methamphetamine laboratories. Their crime scene cleaners are licensed professionals. National Crime Scene Cleanup Association is headquartered out of Patchogue, NY, as well as holding various satellite offices throughout the continental United States.

== Virtual reality educational software ==
In June 2016, National Crime Scene Cleanup Association publicly announced plans surrounding their new educational experience, SafeGuard. Safeguard is a virtual reality educational experience designed to teach the public about the hazards and outline the details, equipment, and tools used in a typical crime scene remediation. Users navigate around a virtual crime scene and can interact and learn about various information points that show up near objects of interest. National Crime Scene Cleanup Association launched a new site to provide screenshots and updates on when the software would release.

National Crime Scene Cleanup Association also followed up with a new initiative following a few months after the announcement of Safeguard. This new initiative, dubbed 'STVR', is planned on being a virtual reality safety training course. Using the same concepts of interactivity and learning, STVR is being developed to be a safer alternative to standard 'textbook' learning, and provide more hands on learning without the risks that are normally associated with handling or working near hazardous materials and situations. STVR will not only focus on crime scene hazards training but will also cover a wide array of scenarios and situations ranging from standard OSHA hazards to dealing with toxic chemicals spills. STVR is being targeted for use by hospitals and companies to train future professionals, nurses, rescue and hazmat workers.

== Notable operations ==
=== Ebola in New York City ===
During the Ebola crisis in New York City, the National Crime Scene Cleanup Association provided support to the Bio Recovery Corporation crew, in the decontamination of Craig Spencer's apartment. Bio Recovery Corporation was hired to disinfect and clean the apartment, as well as the bowling alley, The Gutter, that Dr Spencer visited while diagnosed with Ebola. James Michel, at the time President of NCSCA, appeared with Sal Pane on news networks as consultants.

=== Air chemical testing ===
In November 2015, it was announced that the National Crime Scene Cleanup Association, along with scientist J. Marvin Herndon and documentary filmmaker Michael J. Murphy, were to set out in 2016 to obtain test samples from the phenomenon known as 'Chem Trails'. The proposed testing involved two pilots from the association flying powered paragliders powered paragliders, equipped with air-monitoring equipment to collect samples. All tests were to be verified by Dr Herndon, as well as documented by Michael J. Murphy, to be released as a feature at a later date.

=== The Alec Baldwin Shooting Cleanup (2021) ===
The National Crime Scene Cleanup Association was hired to clean up after the Rust (2021) shooting incident. The crew was hired to remove the biohazards from the church on the Bonanza Creek Ranch in Bonanza City, New Mexico, just 13 miles southwest of Santa Fe, New Mexico. It is considered one of their most notable cleanups to date.

== Initial public offering ==
In March 2016, National Crime Scene Cleanup Association's parent company, Prestige Worldwide Group, announced that they would begin receiving an initial public offering on NCSCA. This was after Prestige Worldwide Group acquired three crime scene cleanup firms. These new additions increased National Crime Scene Cleanup Association's reach and resources.

== In the media ==
In February 2017, National Crime Scene Cleanup Association company appeared on an episode of The Guardians on Animal Planet. In the episode, the National Crime Scene Cleanup Association assisted the cast and crew of the show in the remediation of a cat hoarding veteran who lived in the woods. Workers donated their time and equipment to convert the veterans living area into a hospitable one, and helped capture the feral cats so they could be spayed and neutered.

== Regulatory compliance and certification services ==
NCSCA provides regulatory compliance and certification support for biohazard and crime scene cleanup companies throughout the United States. The organization serves as a third-party compliance facilitator, helping firms meet occupational safety and environmental standards established by agencies such as the Occupational Safety and Health Administration (OSHA), Environmental Protection Agency, Department of Transportation, and various state-level departments of environmental protection.

NCSCA’s compliance program assists cleanup companies in maintaining adherence to OSHA Bloodborne Pathogen Standards and Hazardous Waste Operations and Emergency Response training requirements, and other regulations governing the handling and disposal of hazardous materials. Its scope also includes guidance on lead, asbestos, mold, and IICRC standards for trauma and biohazard remediation.

According to OSHA’s public database, Outreach Training Program classes are delivered by authorized outreach instructors who specialize in workplace safety education.

Through these programs, NCSCA acts as a regulatory liaison for cleanup companies, helping them manage documentation, training renewals, audit preparation, and interagency communication to ensure full operational compliance.
