= Ebola virus cases in the United States =

Ebola virus disease in the U.S.

Map of Ebola cases and infrastructure throughout the U.S.
- Cases contracted in the U.S.: 2
- Cases first diagnosed in U.S.: 4 (Note: Duncan contracted Ebola in Liberia and was diagnosed in the U.S.: Two of the victims had had direct contact with Duncan.; One victim was diagnosed in New York City; his case is unrelated to the Texas cases.)
- Cases evacuated to U.S. from other countries: 7
- Total cases: 11 (Note: This takes into account the seven Americans who were medically evacuated from West Africa with Ebola.)
- Deaths: 2
- Recoveries from Ebola: 9
- Active cases: 0

Four laboratory-confirmed cases of Ebola virus disease (commonly known as "Ebola") occurred in the United States in 2014. Eleven cases were reported, including these four cases and seven cases medically evacuated from other countries. The first was reported in September 2014. Nine of the people contracted the disease outside the US and traveled into the country, either as regular airline passengers or as medical evacuees; of those nine, two died. Two people contracted Ebola in the United States. Both were nurses who treated an Ebola patient; both recovered.

On September 30, 2014, the Centers for Disease Control and Prevention (CDC) announced that Thomas Eric Duncan, a 45-year-old visiting the United States from Liberia, had been diagnosed with Ebola in Dallas, Texas. Duncan, who had been visiting family in Dallas, was treated at Texas Health Presbyterian Hospital Dallas. By October 4, his condition had deteriorated from "serious but stable" to "critical". On October 8, he died of Ebola.

The other three cases were identified in October 2014 as Nina Pham and Amber Joy Vinson, two nurses who had treated Duncan at the hospital; and physician Craig Spencer, who had just returned from working with Doctors Without Borders in Guinea and was diagnosed and treated at Bellevue Hospital in New York City. Hundreds of people were tested or monitored for potential Ebola virus infection, but the two nurses were the only confirmed cases of locally transmitted Ebola. Public health experts and the Obama administration opposed instituting a travel ban on Ebola endemic areas, stating that it would be ineffective and would paradoxically worsen the situation.

No one who contracted Ebola while in the United States died from it. No new cases were diagnosed in the United States after Spencer was released from Bellevue Hospital on November 11, 2014.

== Cases diagnosed in the U.S. ==
=== First case: Thomas Eric Duncan ===
==== Thomas Eric Duncan in Liberia ====
Thomas Eric Duncan was from Monrovia, Liberia, to date the country hit hardest by the Ebola virus epidemic. He worked as a personal driver for the general manager of Safeway Cargo, a FedEx contractor in Liberia. According to manager Henry Brunson, Duncan had abruptly quit his job on September 4, 2014, giving no reason.

On September 15, 2014, the family of Marthalene Williams, who later died of Ebola virus disease, could not call an ambulance to transfer the pregnant Williams to a hospital. Duncan, their tenant, helped to transfer Williams by taxi to an Ebola treatment ward in Monrovia. Duncan rode in the taxi to the treatment ward with Williams, her father and her brother.

On September 19, Duncan went to Monrovia Airport, where, according to Liberian officials, he lied about his history of contact with the disease on an airport questionnaire before boarding a Brussels Airlines flight to Brussels. In Brussels, he boarded United Airlines Flight 951 to Washington Dulles Airport. From Dulles, he boarded United Airlines Flight 822 to Dallas/Fort Worth. He arrived in Dallas at 7:01 p.m. CDT on September 20, 2014, and stayed with his partner and her five children, who lived in the Fair Oaks apartment complex in the Vickery Meadow neighborhood of Dallas. Vickery Meadow, the neighborhood in Dallas where Duncan lived, has a large African immigrant population and is Dallas's densest neighborhood.

==== Duncan's illness in Dallas ====
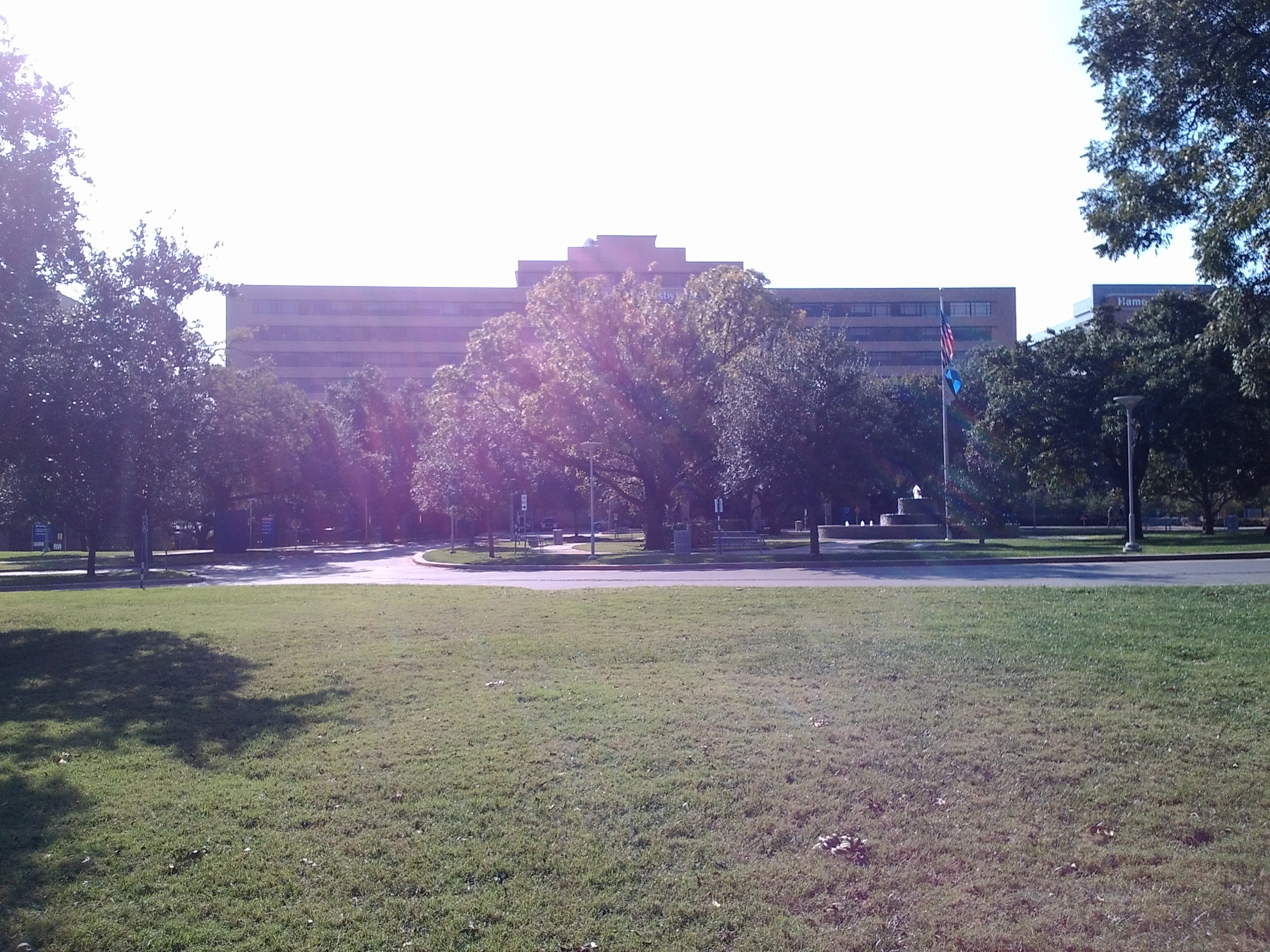
Texas Health Presbyterian Hospital, where Duncan was treated

Duncan began experiencing symptoms on September 24, 2014, and arrived at the Texas Health Presbyterian Hospital emergency room at 10:37 p.m. on September 25. At 11:36 p.m., a triage nurse asked him about his symptoms, and he reported feeling "abdominal pain, dizziness, nausea and headache (new onset)". The nurse recorded a fever of 100.1 °F (37.8 °C), but did not inquire as to his travel history as this was not triage protocol at the time. At 12:05 a.m., Duncan was admitted into a treatment area room where the on-duty physician accessed the electronic health record (EHR). The physician noted nasal congestion, a runny nose, and abdominal tenderness. Duncan was given paracetamol (acetaminophen) at 1:24 a.m. CT scan results came back noting "no acute disease" for the abdominal and pelvic areas and "unremarkable" for the head. Lab results returned showing slightly low white blood cells, low platelets, increased creatinine, and elevated levels of the liver enzyme AST. His temperature was noted at 103.0 °F (39.4 °C) at 3:02 a.m. and 101.2 °F (38.4 °C) at 3:32 a.m. Duncan was diagnosed with sinusitis and abdominal pain and sent home at 3:37 a.m. with a prescription for antibiotics, which are not effective for treating viral diseases.

What we're seeing now is not an "outbreak" or an "epidemic" of Ebola in America. This is a serious disease, but we can't give in to hysteria or fear. – President Barack Obama on the Ebola outbreak

Duncan's condition worsened, and he was transported on September 28 to the same Texas Health Presbyterian Hospital emergency room by ambulance. He arrived in the emergency room at 10:07 a.m., experiencing diarrhea, abdominal pain, and fever. Within fifteen minutes, a doctor noted that Duncan had recently come from Liberia and needed to be tested for Ebola. The doctor described following "strict [CDC] protocol" including wearing a mask, gown, and gloves. At 12:58 p.m., the doctor called the CDC directly. By 9:40 p.m., Duncan was experiencing explosive diarrhea and projectile vomiting. At 8:28 a.m. the next morning, the doctor noted that he "appeared to be deteriorating". By 11:32 a.m., he was severely fatigued, enough to prevent him from using the bedside toilet. Later that day, he was transferred to an intensive care unit (ICU) after all other patients had been evacuated. The next day, September 30, he was diagnosed with Ebola virus disease after a positive test result.

Duncan's diagnosis was publicly confirmed during a CDC news conference the same day. That evening, Duncan reported feeling better and requested to watch a movie. The following morning, he was breathing rapidly and complaining of "pain all over". By the afternoon, however, he was able to eat, and the doctor noted that he was feeling better. The next day, October 3, he again reported feeling abdominal pain. That evening, the hospital contacted Chimerix, a biotechnology company developing Brincidofovir to combat the disease. The next day, Duncan's organs were failing, and he was intubated to help him breathe. In the afternoon, the hospital began administering Brincidofovir. Nurses Nina Pham and Amber Joy Vinson continued to care for Duncan around the clock. On October 7, the hospital reported that Duncan's condition was improving.However, he died at 7:51 a.m. on October 8, becoming the first person to die in the United States of Ebola virus disease and the index patient for the later infections of nurses Pham and Vinson.

==== Contact tracing ====
On October 5, the CDC announced it had lost track of a homeless man who had been in the same ambulance as Duncan. They announced efforts were underway to find the man and place him in a comfortable and compassionate monitoring environment. Later that day, the CDC announced that the man had been found and was being monitored.

Up to 100 people may have had contact with those who had direct contact with Duncan after he showed symptoms. Health officials later monitored 50 low- and 10 high-risk contacts, the high-risk contacts being Duncan's close family members and three ambulance workers who took him to the hospital. Everyone who came into contact with Duncan was being monitored daily to watch for symptoms of the virus, until October 20, when health officials removed 43 out of the 48 initial contacts of Thomas Duncan from isolation. On November 7, 2014, Dallas was officially declared "Ebola free" after 177 monitored people cleared the 21 day threshold without becoming ill.

==== Reactions ====
On October 2, Liberian authorities said they could prosecute Duncan if he returned because before flying he had filled out a form in which he had falsely stated he had not come into contact with an Ebola case. Liberian President Ellen Johnson Sirleaf told the Canadian Broadcasting Corporation she was angry with Duncan for what he had done, especially given how much the United States was doing to help tackle the crisis: "One of our compatriots didn't take due care, and so, he's gone there and in a way put some Americans in a state of fear, and put them at some risk, and so I feel very saddened by that and very angry with him. ... The fact that he knew (he might be a carrier) and he left the country is unpardonable, quite frankly." Before his death, Duncan brazenly claimed that he did not know at the time of boarding the flight that he had been exposed to Ebola; he said he believed the woman he helped was having a miscarriage, which contradicts corroborated accounts from family members who also helped transport the woman to an Ebola ward.

Duncan's family said the care Duncan received was at best "incompetent" and at worst "racially motivated". Family members threatened legal action against the hospital where Duncan received treatment. In response, Texas Health Presbyterian Hospital issued a statement, "Our care team provided Mr. Duncan with the same high level of attention and care that would be given any patient, regardless of nationality or ability to pay for care. We have a long history of treating a multicultural community in this area." The hospital spent an estimated $500,000 to treat the uninsured Duncan.

Officials at Texas Presbyterian Hospital reported that patients' cancellation of elective surgeries and potential emergency patients' preference for other hospitals' emergency rooms had left their hospital looking like a "ghost town".

The reaction to the care and treatment of Thomas Duncan, and the subsequent transmission to two of the nurses on his care team, caused several hospitals to question the extent to which they are obligated to treat Ebola patients. Their concern surrounds the reality that understaffed and poorly equipped hospitals performing invasive procedures, like renal dialysis and intubation, both of which Duncan received at Texas Presbyterian, could put staff at too much risk for contracting the virus. Emory University Hospital in Atlanta also used renal dialysis in treating patients at their biocontainment unit, but no health care workers became infected. In October 2014 Vickery Meadow residents stated that people were discriminating against them because of the incident.

=== Second case: Nina Pham ===
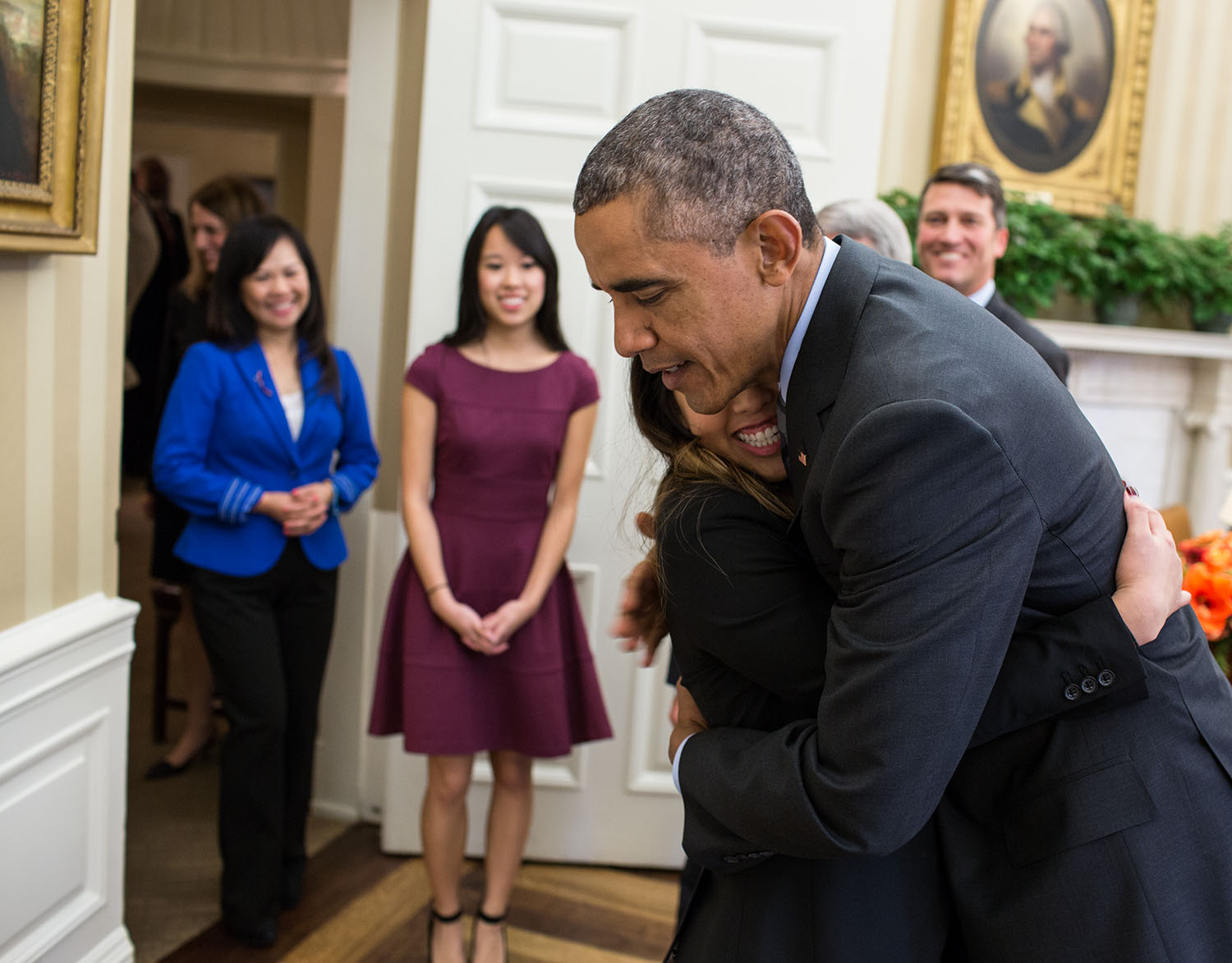
President Obama hugs Nina Pham at the White House after her treatment at the National Institutes of Health in Bethesda, Maryland.

On the night of October 10, Nina Pham, a 26-year-old nurse who had treated Duncan at Texas Health Presbyterian Hospital, reported a low-grade fever and was placed in isolation. On October 11, she tested positive for Ebola virus, becoming the first person to contract the virus in the U.S. On October 12, the CDC confirmed the positive test results. Hospital officials said Pham had worn the recommended protective gear when treating Duncan on his second visit to the hospital and had "extensive contact" with him on "multiple occasions". Pham was in stable condition as of October 12.

On October 16, Pham was transferred to the National Institutes of Health Clinical Center in Bethesda, Maryland. On October 24, the NIH declared Pham free of the Ebola virus. That day Pham traveled to the White House where she met with President Obama.

==== Controversies and lawsuit ====
Tom Frieden, director of the Centers for Disease Control and Prevention, initially blamed a breach in protocol for the infection. The hospital's chief clinical officer, Dr. Dan Varga, said all staff had followed CDC recommendations. Bonnie Costello of National Nurses United said, "You don't scapegoat and blame when you have a disease outbreak. We have a system failure. That is what we have to correct." Frieden later spoke to "clarify" that he had not found "fault with the hospital or the healthcare worker". National Nurses United criticized the hospital for its lack of Ebola protocols and for guidelines that were "constantly changing". Briana Aguirre, a nurse who had cared for Nina Pham, criticized the hospital in an appearance on NBC's Today Show. Aguirre said that she and others had not received proper training or personal protective equipment, and that the hospital had not provided consistent protocols for handling potential Ebola patients into the second week of the crisis. A report indicated that healthcare workers did not wear hazmat suits until Duncan's test results confirmed his infection due to Ebola, two days after his admission to the hospital. Frieden later said that the CDC could have been more aggressive in the management and control of the virus at the hospital.

On March 2, 2015, The New York Times reported that Pham filed a suit against Texas Health Resources, her hospital's parent company, accusing it of "negligence, fraud and invasion of privacy". Pham was described as still experiencing numerous physical and psychological problems, listing lack of proper training as the reason for her illness.

=== Third case: Amber Vinson ===
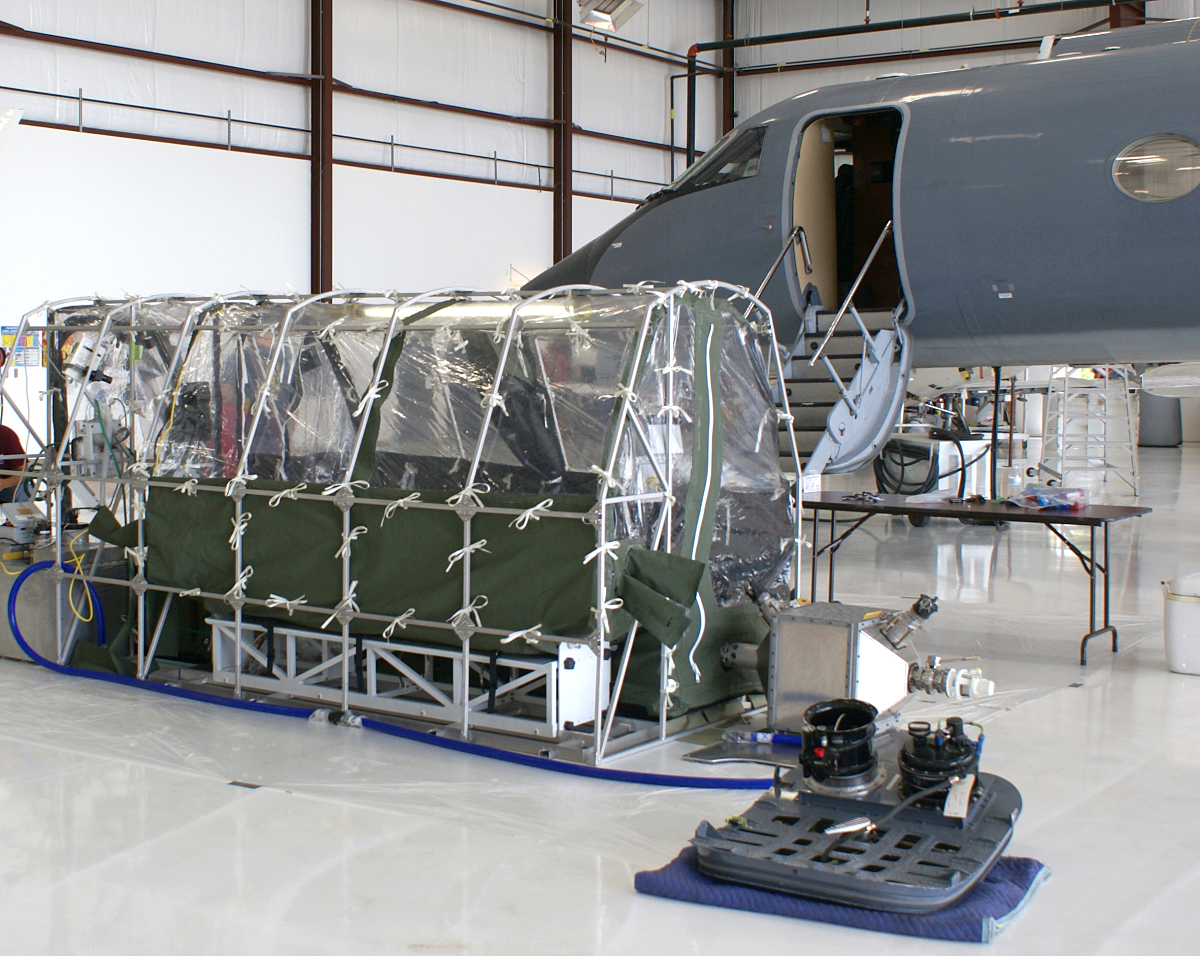
An Aeromedical Biological Containment System (ABCS), the same model used to transport both Nina Pham and Amber Vinson to isolation units

On October 14, a second nurse at the same hospital, identified as 29-year-old Amber Vinson, reported a fever. Amber Joy Vinson was among the nurses who had provided treatment for Duncan. Vinson was isolated within 90 minutes of reporting the fever. By the next day, Vinson had tested positive for Ebola virus. On October 13, Vinson had flown Frontier Airlines Flight 1143 from Cleveland to Dallas, after spending the weekend in Tallmadge and Akron, Ohio. Vinson had an elevated temperature of 99.5 °F (37.5 °C) before boarding the 138-passenger jet, according to public health officials. Vinson had flown to Cleveland from Dallas on Frontier Airlines Flight 1142 on October 10. Flight crew members from Flight 1142 were put on paid leave for 21 days.

During a press conference, CDC Director Tom Frieden stated she should not have traveled since she was one of the health care workers known to have had exposure to Duncan. Passengers of both flights were asked to contact the CDC as a precautionary measure.

It was later discovered that the CDC had, in fact, given Vinson permission to board a commercial flight to Cleveland. Before her trip back to Dallas, she spoke to Dallas County Health Department and called the CDC several times to report her 99.5 °F (37.5 °C) temperature before boarding her flight. A CDC employee who took her call checked a CDC chart, noted that Vinson's temperature was not a true fever – a temperature of 100.4 °F (38.0 °C) or higher – which the CDC deemed as "high risk", and let her board the commercial flight. On October 19, Vinson's family released a statement detailing her government-approved travel clearances and announcing that they had hired attorney Billy Martin. As a precaution, sixteen people in Ohio who had had contact with Vinson were voluntarily quarantined. On October 15, Vinson was transferred to the Emory University Hospital in Atlanta. Seven days later, Vinson was declared Ebola free by Emory University Hospital.

==== Monitoring of other health care workers ====
As of October 15, 2014, there were 76 Texas Presbyterian Hospital health care workers being monitored, having had some level of contact with Thomas Duncan. On October 16, after learning that Vinson had traveled on a plane before her Ebola diagnosis, the Texas Department of State Health Services advised all health care workers exposed to Duncan to avoid travel and public places until 21 days after their last known exposure.

=== Fourth case: Craig Spencer ===
On October 23, Craig Spencer, a physician who treated Ebola patients in West Africa, tested positive for Ebola at Bellevue Hospital Center after having a 100.3 °F (37.9 °C) fever. Officials said he was hospitalized with fever, nausea, pain, and fatigue. He had flown to New York City from Guinea within the previous ten days, and contacted the city's Department of Health and Doctors without Borders after showing symptoms. Dr. Spencer traveled to Guinea to treat Ebola victims on September 16 and returned on October 16. He had been self-monitoring for symptoms of the disease, and began to feel sluggish on October 21, but did not show any symptoms for two days. His case was the first to be diagnosed in New York. The city was trying to find people who may have been in contact with Dr. Spencer between October 21 and 23.

On October 22, the day before he had symptoms, Dr. Spencer rode the New York City Subway, walked on the High Line park, went to a bowling alley and a restaurant in Brooklyn, took an Uber to his home in Manhattan, and took a 3-mile (4.8 km) jog in Harlem near where he lived. Three other people who were with Dr. Spencer in the previous few days were quarantined as well. Dr. Spencer's apartment and the bowling alley he went to were cleaned by hazmat company Bio Recovery Corporation. Health officials stated it was unlikely that Dr. Spencer could have transmitted the disease through subway poles, hand railings, or via bowling balls.

New York hospitals, health-workers, and officials had conducted weeks of drills and training in preparation for patients like Dr. Spencer. Upon arrival at the hospital, he was put in a specially designed isolation center for treatment. Not many details about the treatment were given, except that he participated in decisions relating to his medical care. On October 25, the New York Post reported that an anonymous source had said that nurses at Bellevue had been calling in sick to avoid having to care for Spencer. A hospital spokesperson denied there was a sick out. On November 1, his condition was upgraded to "stable", and on November 7 the hospital announced he was free of Ebola. Spencer was released from the hospital on November 11. He was cheered and applauded by medical staff members, and hugged by the Mayor of New York, Bill de Blasio as he walked out of the hospital. The Mayor also declared: "New York City is Ebola free".

As a result of Dr. Spencer's Ebola case, U.S. Senator Charles Schumer (D-NY), proposed an Ebola fund in an omnibus bill to be considered in fiscal year 2015. Schumer said the funds were needed to compensate New York City, as well as other cities treating Ebola patients, in the same way the federal government covers communities that suffer after a natural disaster. Schumer said Dr. Spencer's care at Bellevue Hospital involved around 100 health care workers. In addition, the city's health department established a 24-hour-a-day operation involving 500 staffers to keep track of the approximately 300 persons from West Africa hot spots who arrive in New York every day.

== Medical evacuations from West Africa ==
Local transmissions – no deaths: Texas Initial cases – deaths: Texas Initial cases – no deaths: New York Medically evacuated cases – no deaths: Georgia, Maryland Medically evacuated cases – deaths: Nebraska

By the time the Ebola virus epidemic in West Africa was over in June 2016, seven Americans had been evacuated to the U.S. for treatment after contracting Ebola virus while working with medical teams trying to stop the epidemic. Kent Brantly, a physician and medical director in Liberia for the aid group Samaritan's Purse, and co-worker Nancy Writebol were infected in July 2014, while working in Monrovia. Both were flown to the United States at the beginning of August via the CDC's Aeromedical Biological Containment System for further treatment in Atlanta's Emory University Hospital. On August 21, Brantly and Writebol recovered and were discharged. Brantly has since donated blood to three others with Ebola (Sacra, Mukpo and Pham).

On September 4, a Massachusetts physician, Rick Sacra, was airlifted from Liberia to be treated in Omaha, Nebraska at the Nebraska Medical Center. Working for Serving In Mission (SIM), he was the third U.S. missionary to contract Ebola. He thought that he probably contracted Ebola while performing a Caesarean section on a patient who had not been diagnosed with the disease. While in hospital, Sacra received a blood transfusion from Brantly, who had recently recovered from the disease. On September 25, Sacra was declared Ebola-free and released from the hospital.

On September 9, the fourth U.S. citizen who contracted the Ebola virus arrived at Emory University Hospital in Atlanta for treatment. On October 16, he released a statement saying he had improved and expected to be discharged in the near future. The doctor was identified as Ian Crozier, and according to the hospital, the sickest patient treated. He was scheduled to receive a blood or serum transfusion from a British man who had recently recovered from the disease. In addition, on September 21, a CDC employee, who showed no symptoms of the disease, was flown back to the United States as a preventive measure after low-risk exposure with a healthcare worker; he posed no risks to his family or the United States, and he is not known to have died. On September 28, a fourth American doctor was admitted to National Institutes of Health hospital.

On October 2, NBC News photojournalist Ashoka Mukpo, covering the outbreak in Liberia, tested positive for Ebola after showing symptoms. Four other members of the NBC team, including physician Nancy Snyderman, were being closely monitored for symptoms. Mukpo was evacuated on October 6 to the University of Nebraska Medical Center for treatment in their isolation unit. On October 21, Mukpo was declared Ebola-free and allowed to return to his home in Rhode Island.

A government official in Sierra Leone announced on November 13, that a doctor from Sierra Leone, a permanent resident of the United States married to a U.S. citizen, would be transported to the Nebraska Medical Center for treatment for Ebola. The doctor, identified later as Martin Salia, became symptomatic while in Sierra Leone. His initial Ebola test came back negative, but his symptoms persisted. He attempted to treat his symptoms, which included vomiting and diarrhea, believing he had malaria. A second test for Ebola came back positive. His family expressed concern that the delay in diagnosis might have impacted his recovery. Salia arrived at Eppley Airfield in Omaha on November 15, and was transported to the Nebraska Medical Center. According to the team that assisted in the transport, he was critically ill and considered to be the sickest patient to be evacuated, but stable enough to fly. On November 17, Salia died from the disease. Dr. Philip Smith, medical director of the biocontainment unit at Nebraska Medical Center, said Salia's disease was already "extremely advanced" by the time he arrived in Omaha. By then, Salia's kidneys had failed and he was in acute respiratory distress. Salia's treatment included a blood plasma transfusion from an Ebola survivor, as well as the experimental drug ZMapp. Salia had been working as a general surgeon in Freetown, Sierra Leone when he fell ill. It was not clear when or where he had had contact with Ebola patients.

A U.S. clinician contracted Ebola while working in Port Loko, Sierra Leone. He collapsed in the hospital and colleagues who assisted him were monitored for exposure. He was diagnosed with Ebola on March 10, 2015, and medically evacuated to the National Institutes of Health in Bethesda, Maryland on March 13. His condition was downgraded from serious to critical on March 16. The ten exposed colleagues were flown back to the U.S., going into isolation near the Ebola-rated hospitals at Nebraska, Georgia, and Maryland. On March 26, 2015, the NIH upgraded the medically evacuated health worker being treated in Bethesda from critical to serious. A further 16 volunteers were monitored for possible exposure. On April 9, 2015, the clinician was upgraded to good condition and discharged. He was treated by Dr. Anthony Fauci, who later said he was "the sickest person he had ever treated, who recovered." This patient revealed his identity in late 2019 as Preston Gorman, a physician assistant.

== Containment efforts ==
=== Operation United Assistance ===
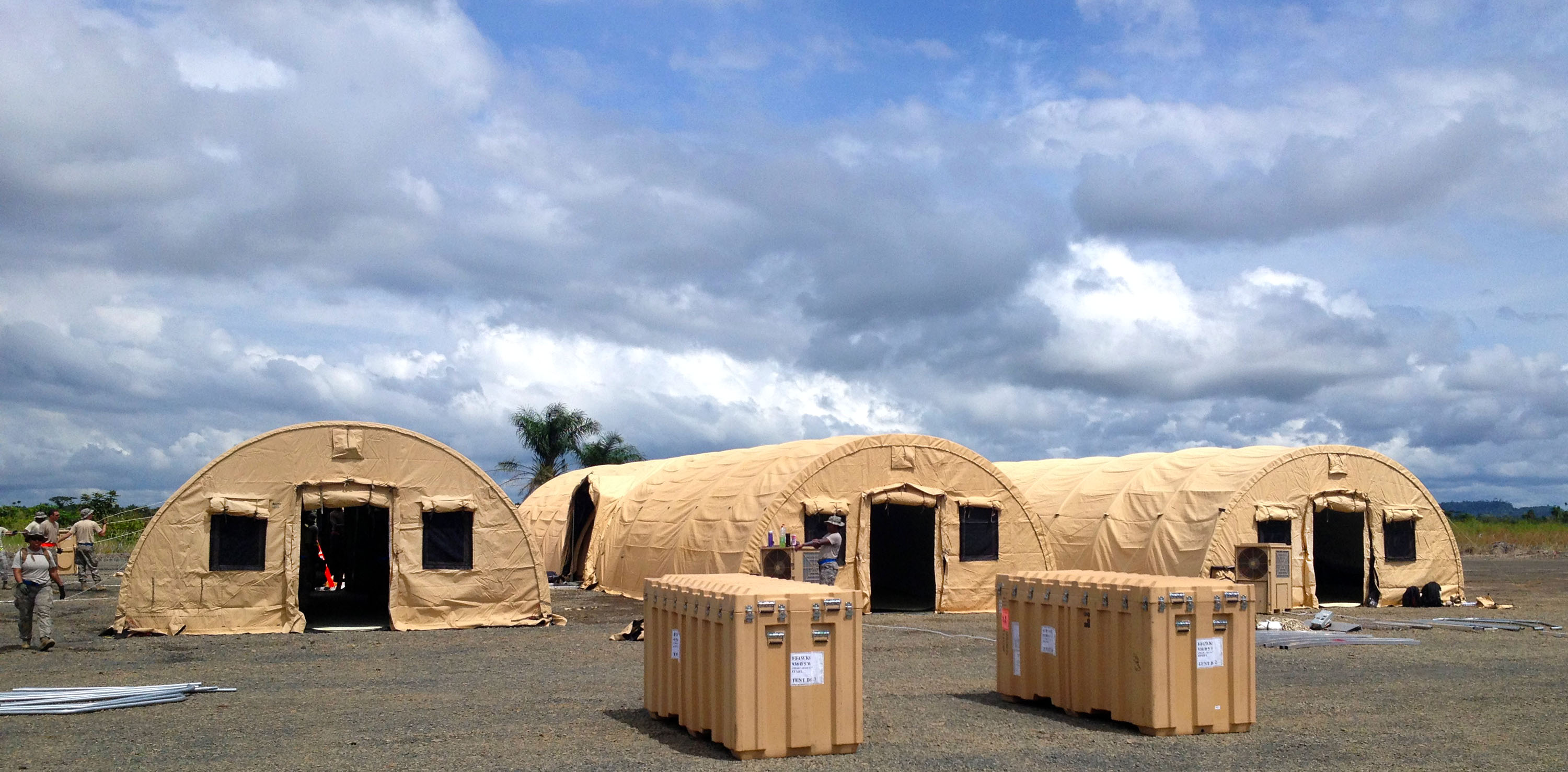
The 25-bed Monrovia Medical Unit was constructed for health care workers supporting Operation United Assistance.

The U.S. military released plans to send up to 4,000 troops to West Africa to establish treatment centers starting September 29. The troops are tasked with building modular hospitals known as Expeditionary Medical Support Systems (EMEDS). Plans included building a 25-bed hospital for health care workers and 17 treatment centers with 100 beds each in Liberia. By the end of September 2014 150 military personnel were helping USAID in the capital, Monrovia.

U.S. Army chief of staff Ray Odierno ordered on October 27 a 21-day quarantine of all soldiers returning from Operation United Assistance. Up to 12 soldiers were quarantined in a U.S. base in Italy.

=== Revised CDC guidelines ===
Since 2007, US hospitals have relied on CDC infection control protocols to contain Ebola virus disease. Until October 20, 2014, the CDC guidelines allowed hospitals wide latitude to select gear based on interaction between healthcare workers and patients and on the mode of transmission of the disease being handled. The guidelines suggested gowns with "full coverage of the arms and body front, from neck to the mid-thigh or below, will ensure that clothing and exposed upper body areas are protected", and additionally recommend masks and goggles.

Public health expert Sean G. Kaufman said that many American hospitals improperly trained their personnel to handle Ebola cases because they were following federal guidelines that were too lax. US officials abruptly changed their guidelines on October 14. The New York Times stated that this was an effective acknowledgment that there were problems with the procedures for protecting health care workers. Kaufman, who oversaw infection control at Emory University Hospital while it treated Ebola patients, has said the previous CDC guidelines were "absolutely irresponsible and dead wrong". Kaufman called to warn the agency about its lax guidelines but, according to Kaufman, "They kind of blew me off."

A Doctors Without Borders representative, whose organization has been treating Ebola patients in Africa, criticized a CDC poster for lax guidelines on containing Ebola, saying, "It doesn't say anywhere that it's for Ebola. I was surprised that it was only one set of gloves, and the rest bare hands. It seems to be for general cases of infectious disease."

The national nursing union National Nurses United criticized the CDC for making the guidelines voluntary. There were complaints at the Texas hospital that healthcare professionals had to use tape to cover their exposed necks. According to Frieden, the CDC is appointing a hospital site manager to oversee Ebola containment efforts and are making "intensive efforts" to retrain and supervise staff.

On October 14, the WHO reported that 125 contacts in the United States were being traced and monitored. On October 20, the CDC updated its guidance on personal protective equipment with new detailed instructions that include specifying that no skin should be exposed and adding extensive instructions for donning and doffing the equipment. On October 20 CDC updated its guidance to add clarification that Ebola may spread through wet droplets such as sneezes.

=== Ebola response coordinator ===
In mid-October 2014, President Barack Obama appointed Ron Klain as the "Ebola response coordinator" of the United States. Klain is a lawyer who previously served as chief of staff to vice presidents Al Gore and Joe Biden. Klain had no medical or health care experience. After criticism, Obama said, "It may make sense for us to have one person ... so that after this initial surge of activity, we can have a more regular process just to make sure that we're crossing all the T's and dotting all the I's going forward". Klain reported to Homeland Security Adviser Lisa Monaco and National Security Advisor Susan Rice. Klain did not coordinate with hospitals and the United States Public Health Service, as this was the responsibility of Nicole Lurie, Assistant Secretary for Preparedness and Response. President Barack Obama attempted to calm public fears by hugging nurse Nina Pham who had been cured of Ebola.

=== Rapid response teams ===
President Obama announced the formation of rapid response teams to travel to hospitals with newly diagnosed patients. A second set of teams will prep hospitals in cities deemed most likely to see an Ebola virus case. Three of those teams are already operating. In announcing the formation of the teams, President Obama explained, "We want a rapid response team, a SWAT team essentially, from the CDC to be on the ground as quickly as possible, hopefully within 24 hours, so that they are taking the local hospital step by step through what needs to be done." The CDC has developed two sets of teams, identified by the acronyms CERT (CDC Ebola Response Team) and FAST (Facility Assessment and Support Teams). The CERTs have 10 to 20 people each, who can be sent to a hospital with a suspected and/or laboratory confirmed Ebola virus case. The teams are drawn from 100 CDC workers and others. The FAST teams assist hospitals that have indicated they are willing to take on Ebola cases.

=== Airport screening ===
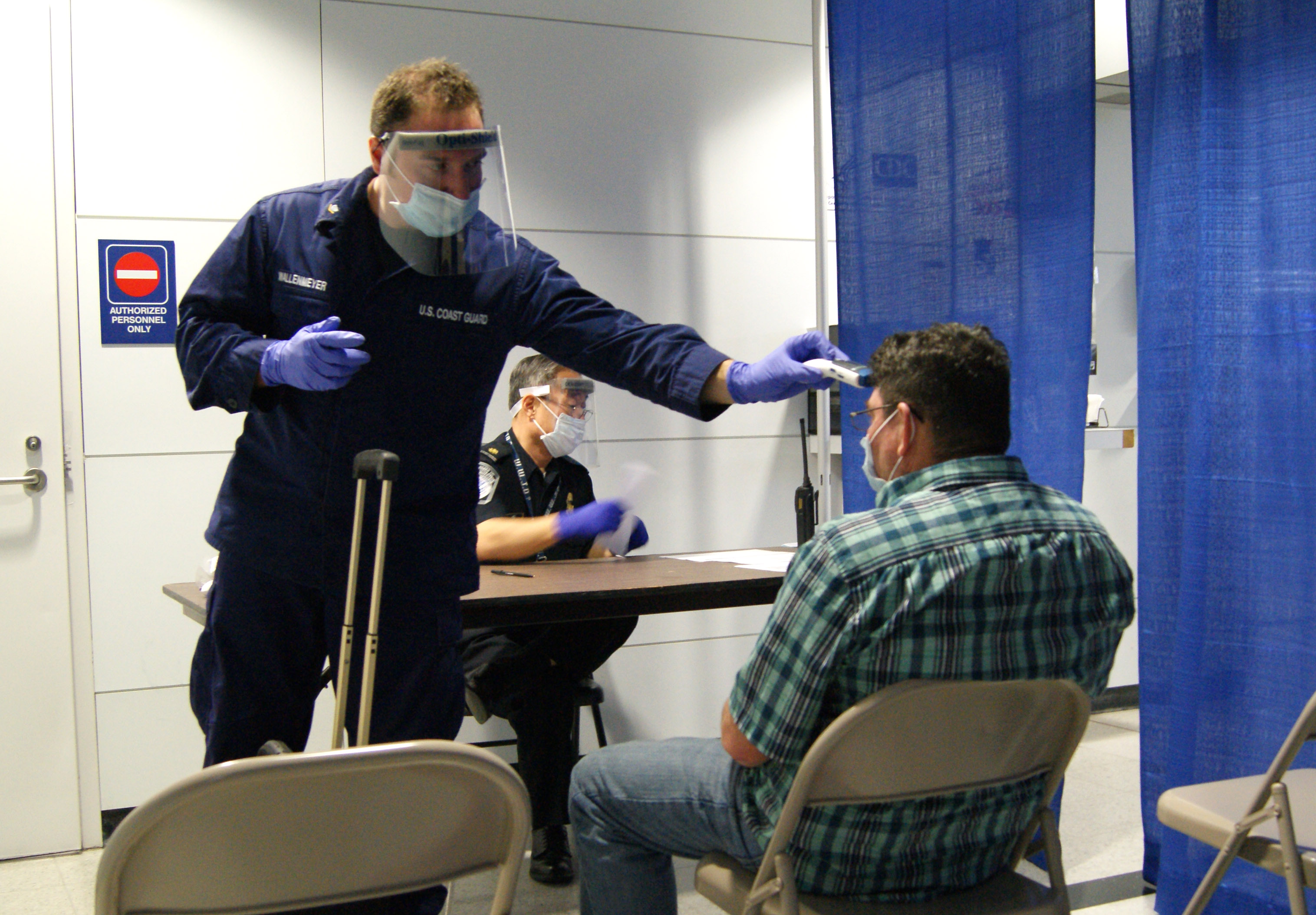
Ebola screening of a passenger who arrived from Sierra Leone at Chicago's O'Hare airport

Starting in October 2014, U.S. government officials began questioning airplane passengers and screening them for fever at five U.S. airports: John F. Kennedy International Airport in New York, Newark Liberty International Airport in New Jersey, O'Hare International Airport in Illinois, Washington Dulles International Airport in Virginia, and Hartsfield–Jackson Atlanta International Airport in Georgia. Combined, these airports receive more than 94% of passengers from Guinea, Liberia, and Sierra Leone, the three countries most affected by Ebola.

Although no plans have been announced for other airports, screening in the U.S. represents a second layer of protection since passengers are already being screened upon exiting these three countries. However, the risk can never be eliminated. On October 21, the Department of Homeland Security announced that all passengers from Liberia, Sierra Leone, and Guinea will be required to fly into one of these five airports. On October 23, the CDC announced that all passengers from these countries would receive 21-day monitoring.

A physician with the WHO, Aileen Marty, who had spent 31 days in Nigeria, criticized the complete lack of screening for Ebola on her recent return to the United States through Miami International Airport.

There have also been calls by congressional leaders, including U.S. representative Ed Royce, Chairman of the House Foreign Relations Committee, and U.S. representative Michael McCaul of Texas, Chair of the Homeland Security Committee, to suspend issuing visas to travelers from the affected West African countries, including Liberia, Sierra Leone, and Guinea.

=== Mandatory 21-day quarantine ===
21 day mandatory quarantine for people exposed to people with Ebola: New York, New Jersey, Connecticut, California 21 day mandatory quarantine for people exposed to people with Ebola without wearing protective gear or otherwise at high risk: Illinois, Virginia 21 day mandatory twice daily temperature reporting and voluntary in-home quarantine for people exposed to people with Ebola: Maine 21 day mandatory twice daily health screening or temperature reporting for people who have been in West African Ebola-affected countries: Florida, Georgia, Maryland, Pennsylvania

On October 7, 2014, Connecticut governor Dannel Malloy signed an order authorizing the mandatory quarantine for 21 days of anyone, even if asymptomatic, who had direct contact with Ebola patients. Nine people were quarantined on October 22, in accordance with the Connecticut order.

At a joint news conference on October 24, New York governor Andrew Cuomo and New Jersey governor Chris Christie announced that they were imposing a mandatory 21-day quarantine on all air travelers returning to New York and New Jersey from West Africa who have had contact with Ebola patients. In explaining the move from the CDC's voluntary quarantine to a state ordered mandatory one, Cuomo cited the case of Dr. Spencer. "In a region like this, you go out three times, you ride the subway, you ride the bus, you could affect hundreds of people." Cuomo praised Dr. Spencer's work but stated, "He's a doctor and even he didn't follow the voluntary quarantine. Let's be honest."

Governors Cuomo and Christie stated that their two states needed to go beyond the federal CDC guidelines. Cuomo said Dr. Spencer's activity in the days before his diagnosis showed the guidelines, which includes urging health care workers and others who have had contact with Ebola patients to voluntarily quarantine themselves, were not enough.

Late on October 26, Cuomo modified the state's quarantine procedure, stating that people entering New York who have had contact with Ebola patients in West Africa will be quarantined in their homes for the 21 days, with twice daily checks to ensure their health has not changed and that they are complying with the order, and would receive some compensation for lost wages, if any. President Obama and his staff had been attempting to persuade Cuomo, Christie, and the government of Illinois to reverse their mandatory quarantines.

Illinois governor Pat Quinn issued a similar quarantine authorization the same day as New York and New Jersey initially did, with Florida governor Rick Scott on October 25, authorizing mandatory twice daily monitoring for 21 days of people identified as coming from countries affected by Ebola. Illinois health officials later said that only people at high risk of Ebola exposure, such as not wearing protective gear near Ebola patients, will be quarantined.

Pennsylvania, Maryland, and Georgia have all authorized mandatory twice daily health monitoring and/or temperature reporting for 21 days for people exposed to people with Ebola. Virginia has also implemented mandatory twice daily temperature reporting and daily monitoring from health authorities, but has also authorized mandatory quarantine for higher risk patients. California mandated a 21-day quarantine for all health workers who have had contact with Ebola patients.

Interior of the isolation tent used by University Hospital in New Jersey to quarantine Kaci Hickox

Kaci Hickox, an American nurse who treated Ebola patients in Sierra Leone became the first person placed under the new mandatory quarantine rules on her arrival at Newark Liberty International Airport, in New Jersey. A low-accuracy (forehead) thermometer indicated Hickox developed a fever on Friday night and was taken to University Hospital in Newark. She later tested negative for the Ebola virus but remained quarantined in a medical tent. Hickox and Doctors Without Borders criticized the condition of the quarantine in a tent with a bed and a portable toilet, but without shower facility. Hickox criticized her treatment as inhumane. The hospital responded that they tried their best to accommodate Hickox by allowing her to have computer access, cell phone, reading materials, and providing take-out food and drink. On October 27, after being symptom free for an additional 24-hour period, testing negative for Ebola, and after the state's quarantine policy was relaxed the night before, Hickox was released from quarantine in New Jersey. She has filed suit.

Hickox was escorted out of New Jersey and into Maine the following day by a private convoy of SUVs. Maine governor Paul LePage announced he was joining with his state's health department in seeking legal authority to enforce the quarantine after Hickox announced she would not comply with the isolation protocols in Maine. She left her house on October 29 and 30. The governor said: "She's violated every promise she's made so far, so I can't trust her. I don't trust her." A Maine judge ruled against a mandatory quarantine on October 31, but required Hickox to comply with "direct active monitoring", to coordinate her travel with Maine health officials, and to notify health officials if she develops symptoms of Ebola.

On October 29, Texas governor Rick Perry announced that a Texas nurse returning from Sierra Leone where she treated Ebola patients, had agreed to self-quarantine at her Austin home for 21 days following her return to Texas, and undergo frequent monitoring from state health officials. although she did not have any symptoms of Ebola virus. The nurse was not named to protect her privacy. Perry spoke with the nurse over the phone to thank her for work to fight Ebola.

U.S. Army Chief of Staff Ray Odierno also ordered on October 27 a 21-day quarantine of all soldiers returning from Operation United Assistance in Liberia. As many as 12 soldiers were quarantined in a U.S. base in Italy.

=== Legal protection for government contractors ===
On November 13, 2014, President Obama issued a presidential memorandum, invoking a federal law to immunize contractors hired by the U.S. Agency for International Development (USAID) from liability "with respect to claims, losses, or damage arising out of or resulting from exposure, in the course of performance of the contracts, to Ebola" during the emergency period.

=== School closures ===
There were numerous overreactions to the perceived threat of an Ebola outbreak, particularly on the part of school officials. On October 16, a building housing two schools in the Solon City School District near Cleveland, Ohio, was closed for a single day of disinfection procedures after finding that a staff member may have been on the aircraft that Amber Vinson used on a previous flight. Another school in the Cleveland Metropolitan School District was disinfected overnight due to similar concerns but remained open. In both cases, affected staff were sent home until cleared by health officials. School officials said that they had been assured by city health officials that there was no risk and that the disinfection was "strictly precautionary". Three schools in the Belton Independent School District in Belton, Texas, were also closed. Infectious disease experts considered these closures to be an overreaction and were concerned that it would frighten the public into believing that Ebola is a greater danger than it actually is.

In Hazlehurst, Mississippi, in response to numerous parents keeping their children from attending school, a principal at Hazlehurst Middle School, agreed to take personal vacation time after he had traveled to Zambia, a country with no current Ebola cases and 3,000 miles (4,800 kilometres) away from West Africa.

== Treatment ==
=== Biocontainment units in the U.S. ===
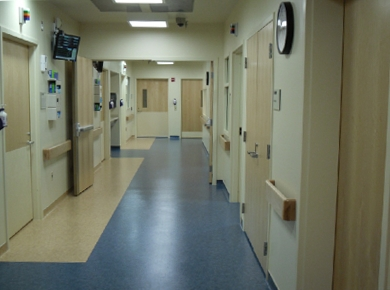
Corridor of NIH Special Clinical Studies Unit, a specialized biocontainment unit. The negative-pressure anterooms on the left lead to negative-pressure patient rooms (not shown in the picture).

The United States has the capacity to isolate and manage 11 patients in four specialized biocontainment units. These include the University of Nebraska Medical Center in Omaha, Nebraska, the National Institutes of Health in Bethesda, Maryland, St. Patrick Hospital and Health Sciences Center in Missoula, Montana and Emory University Hospital in Atlanta, Georgia.

=== Experimental treatments ===
At the time of the outbreak there was no medication for Ebola approved by the U.S. Food and Drug Administration (FDA). The director of the US National Institute of Allergy and Infectious Diseases, Dr. Anthony Fauci, had stated that the scientific community is still in the early stages of understanding how infection with the Ebola virus can be treated and prevented. In October 2020, the U.S. Food and Drug Administration (FDA) approved atoltivimab/maftivimab/odesivimab with an indication for the treatment of infection caused by Zaire ebolavirus. Survival is improved by early supportive care with rehydration and symptomatic treatment. Treatment is primarily supportive in nature.

In late August 2014, both Kent Brantly and Nancy Writebol became the first people to be given the experimental drug ZMapp. They both recovered, but there was no confirmation or proof that the drug was a factor. A Spanish priest with Ebola had taken ZMapp but died afterward. Up until that time, ZMapp had only been tested on primates and looked promising, causing no serious side effects and protecting the animals from infection. The Bill & Melinda Gates Foundation has donated $150,000 to help Amgen increase its production, and the U.S. Department of Health and Human Services has asked a number of centers to also increase production.

There have been at least two promising treatments for those already infected. The first is brincidofovir, an experimental antiviral drug, which was given to Duncan, Mukpo, and Spencer.

Treatment using a transfusion of plasma from Ebola survivors, a form of "passive immunotherapy", since it contains antibodies able to fight the virus, has been used with apparent success on a number of patients. Survivor Kent Brantly donated his blood to Rick Sacra, Ashoka Mukpo and nurse Nina Pham. The World Health Organization (WHO) has made it a priority to try the treatment, and has been telling affected countries how to do it.

=== Experimental preventive vaccines ===
Many Ebola vaccine candidates had been developed in the decade before 2014, but none has yet been approved for clinical use in humans. Several promising vaccine candidates have been shown to protect nonhuman primates (usually macaques) against lethal infection, and some are now going through the clinical trial process.

In late October 2014, Canada planned to ship 800 vials of an experimental vaccine to the WHO in Geneva, the drug having been licensed by NewLink Genetics Corporation, of Iowa. British drugmaker GlaxoSmithKline also announced it had expedited research and development of a vaccine, which, if successful, could be available in 2015. Although it's still unknown which ones will be approved, WHO hopes to have millions of vaccine doses ready sometime in 2015, and expects that five more experimental vaccines will start being tested in March 2015.

In December 2019, the first Ebola vaccine was approved. rVSV-ZEBOV, otherwise known as Ervebo, is a vaccine for adults that prevents the Zaire ebolavirus.

== Public reactions ==
In October 2014, Navarro College, a two-year public school located in Texas, received media attention for admission rejection letters sent to two prospective students from Nigeria. The letters informed the applicants that the college was "not accepting international students from countries with confirmed Ebola cases". On October 16, Navarro's Vice-president Dewayne Gragg issued a statement confirming that there had indeed been a decision to "postpone our recruitment in those nations that the Center for Disease Control and the U.S. State Department have identified as at risk". Nigeria's outbreak was among the least severe in West Africa and was considered over by the WHO on October 20; the Nigerian health ministry had previously announced in late September that there were no confirmed cases of Ebola within the country.

In October 2014, the S. I. Newhouse School of Public Communications at Syracuse University withdrew an invitation it had extended to Pulitzer Prize winning photojournalist Michel du Cille because he'd returned three weeks earlier from covering the Ebola outbreak in Liberia. In October 2014, Case Western Reserve University withdrew their speaking invitation to Dr. Richard E. Besser, chief health editor at ABC News and former director of the CDC. Besser had recently returned from a trip to Liberia.

On October 17, Harvard University imposed limits on travel to Ebola-affected countries (Sierra Leone, Guinea and Liberia) for its students, staff, and faculty. All travel to these countries is "strongly discourage[d]", and such travel as part of a Harvard program requires approval from the provost.

On October 25, CDC allowed state and local officials to set tighter control policies and Barbara Reynolds, a CDC spokeswoman released a statement saying "we will consider any measures that we believe have the potential to make the American people safer". On November 1, Ohio tightened restrictions on people travelling to Western African countries impacted by Ebola.Time magazine's 2014 Person of the Year issue honored health professionals dedicated to fighting Ebola, including Kent Brantly.

On October 28, future president Donald Trump tweeted that governors backing off from the Ebola quarantine would lead to more mayhem. In 2020, during the COVID-19 pandemic in the United States, these tweets were contrasted with Trump's then-opposition to mandatory quarantines.

== See also ==
- Ebola virus epidemic in Guinea
- Ebola virus epidemic in Liberia
- Ebola virus epidemic in Nigeria
- Ebola virus epidemic in Sierra Leone
- Ebola virus disease in Spain
- List of Ebola outbreaks
- West Nile virus in the United States
