= Operation Saber Strike =

US-led military exercises in the Baltics

Saber Strike is an annual international exercise held since 2010 by the United States Army Europe (USAREUR) focused on the Baltic States. The exercise spans multiple locations in Lithuania, Latvia and Estonia and involves approximately 2,000 troops from 14 countries.

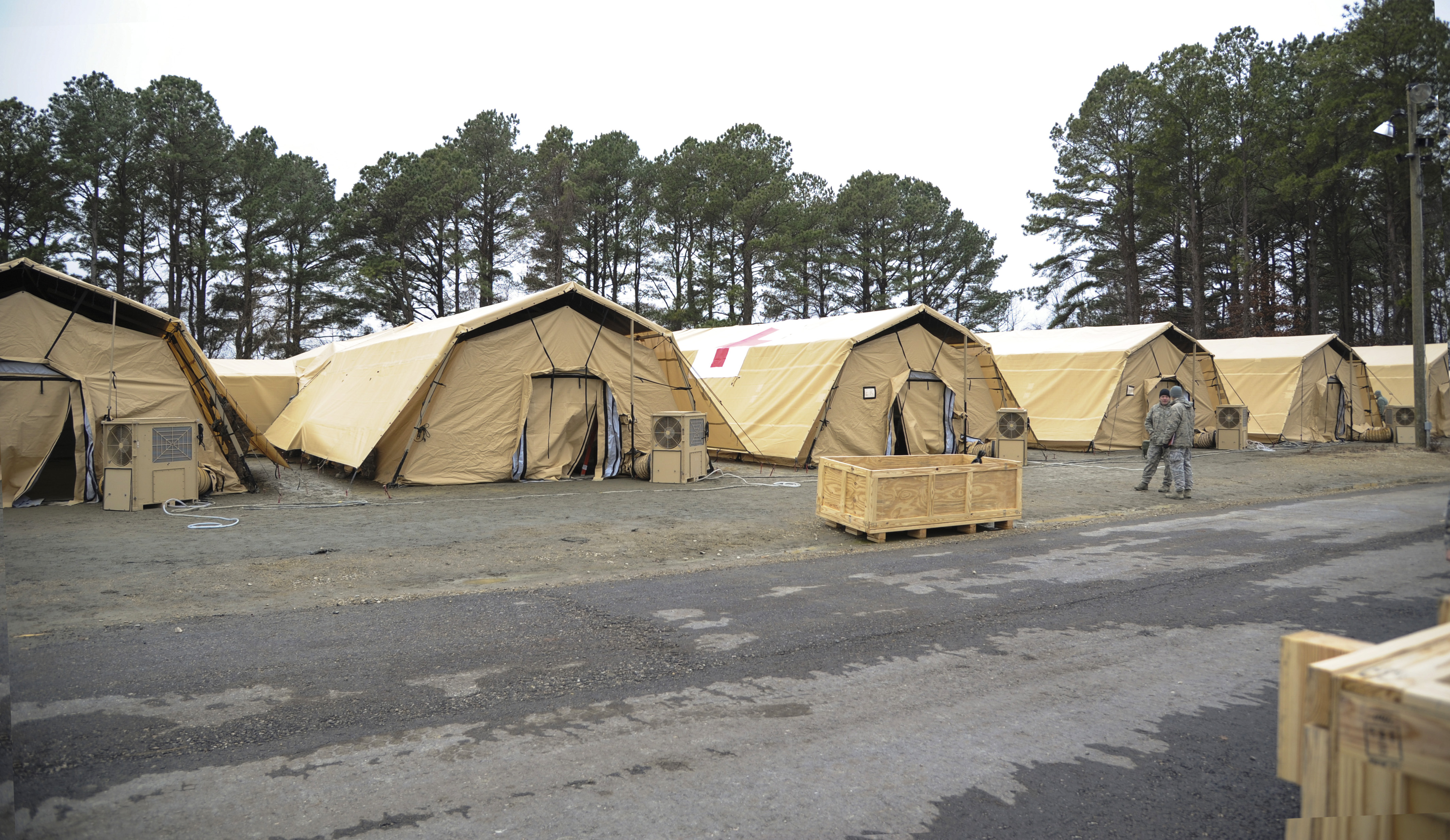
U.S. EMEDS tent deployment (Langley)

The exercise trains participants on command and control as well as interoperability with regional partners and consists of a brigade-level command post exercise and computer assisted exercise, as well as company-level field and situational training exercises. It also features the integration of United States close air support (CAS) with partner nation ground forces and the demonstration of United States Expeditionary Medical Support (EMEDS) capability.

This theater security cooperation exercise provides commanders and their staffs practical experience in organizing, controlling and supporting coalition operations and allows the United States, NATO and participating nations to demonstrate their own roles in contributing and enhancing multinational interoperability and preparing participants for worldwide contingency operations.

== 2011-2020 ==
=== 2011 ===
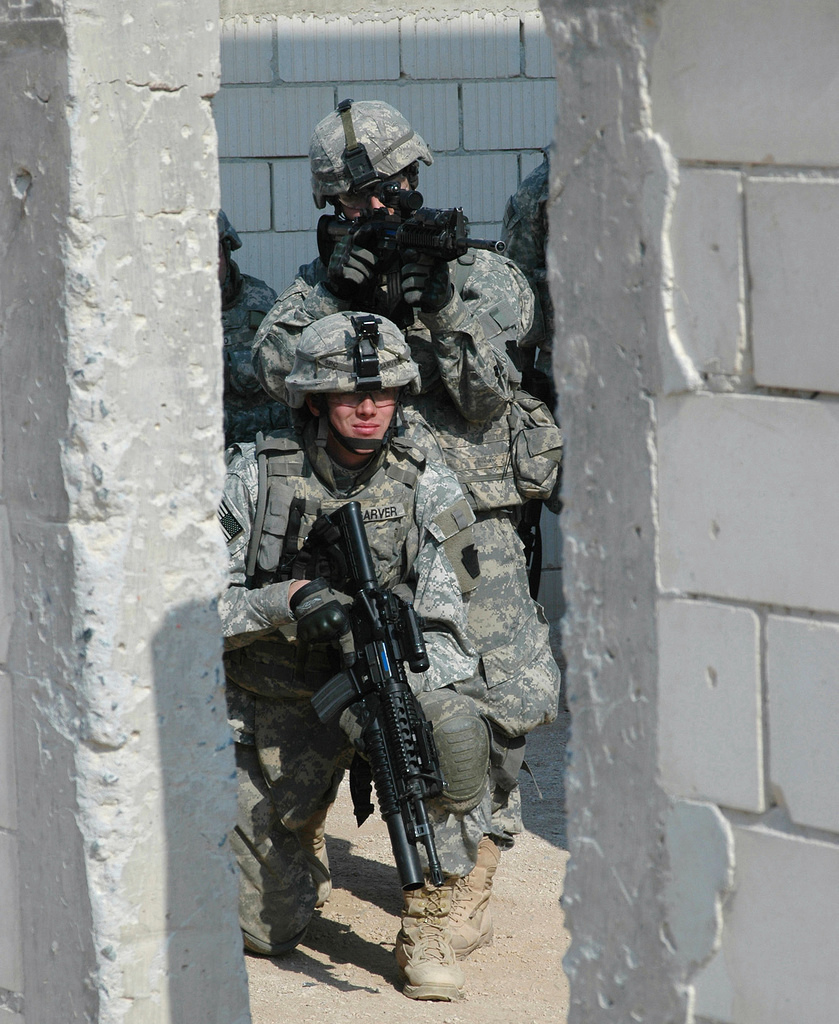
U.S. soldiers from the 56th Stryker Brigade

Saber Strike 2011 was the first of what would be an ongoing cooperative training effort between the four nations bonded by the War in Afghanistan, intended to increase the combat readiness of forces preparing to deploy in support of the ISAF. The exercise included a command post, a field training and situational training exercise aimed at training the participating countries to operate more effectively together. The tasks trained in this exercise were specifically designed to prepare the troops for operations in Afghanistan and included improvised explosive device defeat training, convoy and patrol operations, and cordon and search operations.

Saber Strike was a multinational exercise taking place at the Ādaži Training Area in Latvia, which involved units from Latvia, Lithuania, Estonia, Poland, the United States 56th Stryker Brigade, the United States 172nd Infantry Brigade and the United States 16th Sustainment Brigade. The exercise was not only a training opportunity, but also a sign of importance of the relationships among the participating nations. The United States Army and the Baltic States conducted an opening ceremony for Saber Strike 2011 at the Ādaži Training Area on October 18.

=== 2012 ===
Saber Strike 2012 involved approximately 2,000 troops from 8 countries. This was a second Saber Strike exercise program (scheduled from June 10–22), and was part of a cooperative training effort primarily focused on the three nations of the Baltic States. This exercise prepared participants to operate successfully in a joint, multinational, integrated environment with host-nation support from civil and governmental agencies.

Saber Strike would consists of situational training exercises and a field training exercise taking place at the Ādaži Training Area. A command post exercise would be conducted at various sites in Estonia, including one near Tapa. In addition to the United States Army Europe, Estonia, Latvia, and Lithuania, other participants were included: Canada, Finland, France and the United Kingdom.

Units from United States Army Europe included the United States 21st Theater Sustainment Command, the United States 2nd Cavalry Regiment and the United States Pennsylvania Army National Guard are participating with a company of Strykers which were flown into Latvia. The United States Michigan Air National Guard was participating with American KC-135 and A-10 aircraft who were providing close air support. A company of the United States 4th Marine Division was also there, with a joint terminal air controller (JTAC) team from the United States Washington Air National Guard.

=== 2013 ===
Saber Strike 2013 was for the third time conducted at various training areas in Lithuania, Latvia and Estonia. The exercise was scheduled from June 3–14, participating nations and units included approximately 2,000 troops from 14 countries. Lithuania, Latvia, Estonia, Finland, France, the United Kingdom, NATO's Multinational Corps Northeast (Germany, Poland and Denmark), and the United States. Norway and Sweden send observers.

Units from United States Army Europe included the Contingency Command Post (CCP), Joint Multinational Readiness Center (JMRC), United States 5th Signal Command, United States 21st Theater Sustainment Command, United States 18th Engineer Brigade, United States 234th Engineer Detachment, United States Pennsylvania and Utah Army National Guard. United States Air Forces in Europe; Michigan, Washington and Pennsylvania Air National Guard, and the U.S. Army Cadet Command.

United States Army Europe's contingency command post was located in Pabradė Training Area in Lithuania, and integrated a new system, the Multilateral Interoperable Program, which serves as a conduit to translate data and information systems from the command posts of differing nations.

=== 2014 ===
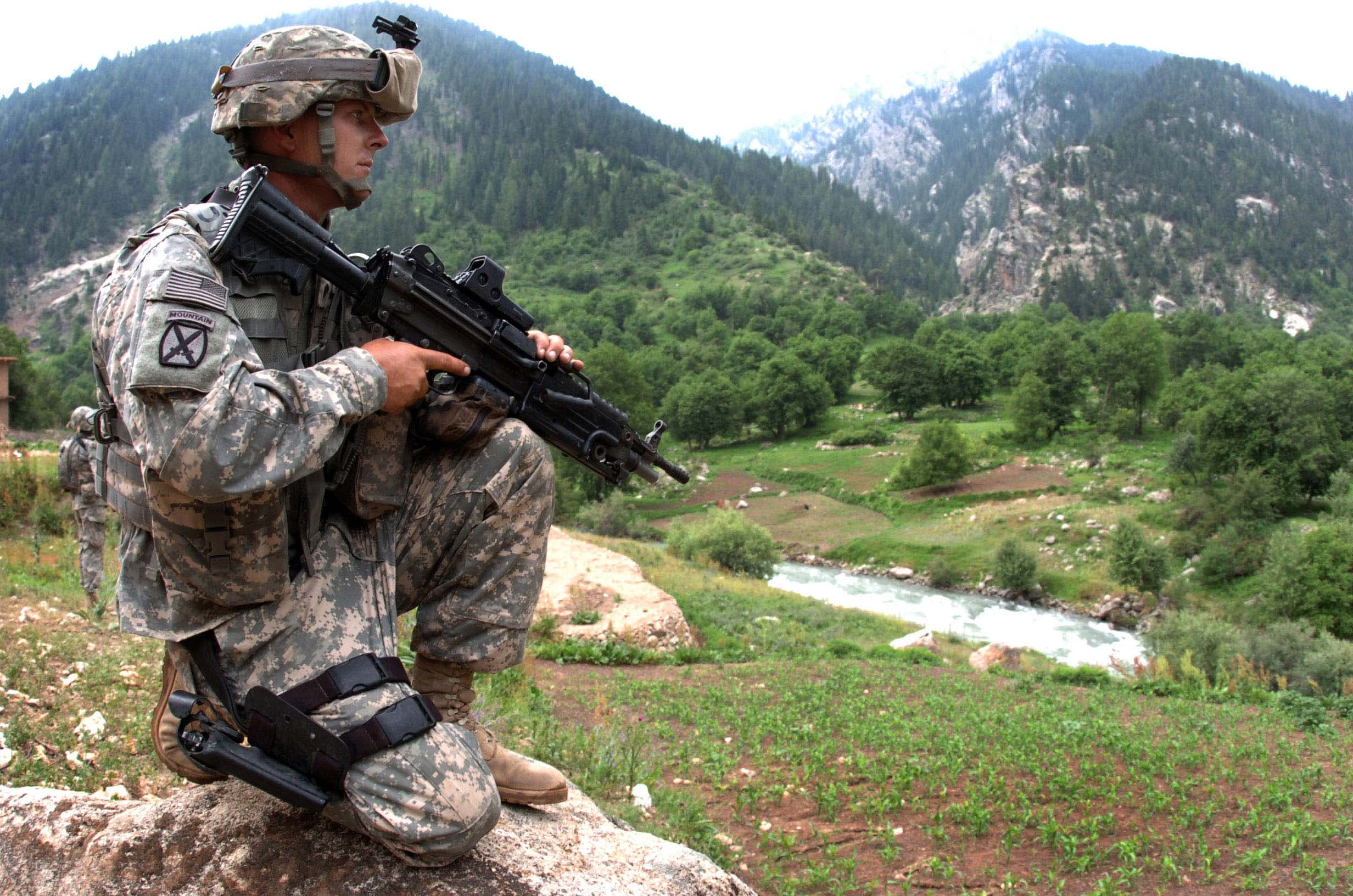
A U.S. National Guardsman in Afghanistan

Saber Strike 2014 was for the fourth time conducted, as multilateral security cooperation exercise (scheduled from June 9–20) at locations throughout the Baltic region. During the three-week exercise troops from 10 countries including the United States, would practice techniques and protocols for coordinating action in defense and assault operations.

This year's objective was to facilitate cooperation among the United States, Lithuania, Latvia and Estonia by improving joint operational capability in a range of missions as well as prepare the participating nations and units to support multilateral contingency operations. A United States Army Europe-led exercise, Saber Strike is again supported by joint and total force service members from the U.S. Air Force and the Army and Air National Guards.

Saber Strike 2014 would become the largest-ever exercise, with 4,700 troops and over 800 military vehicles, such as M2 Bradley, M1126 Stryker, and various APCs: XA-180, XA-202, and M113 taking part in the training.

At the same time Russian maneuvers were conducted in the Kaliningrad Region. The surprise training of first strike forces using naval groups, marines, landing operations of airborne forces, air defense training and firing exercise of front-line aviation.

=== 2015 ===
Saber Strike 2015 took place on June 8–19. It included approximately 6,000 troops from 13 countries: Canada, Denmark, Estonia, Finland, Germany, Latvia, Lithuania, Norway, Poland, Portugal, Slovenia, the United Kingdom and the United States. In addition to Poland, the exercise included operations in Latvia and Lithuania, countries that were formerly part of the Soviet Union and have joined NATO. Countries on Europe's eastern flank register concern about Russian aggression in Ukraine (→ War in Donbass since March 2014).

=== 2016 ===
Saber Strike 2016 took place on May 27-June 22.

Sabre Strike 2016 was criticized by German Foreign Minister Steinmeier in June 2016 as "loud saber-rattling and war cries". It was "disastrous" to narrow the view to a military perspective and to look for salvation in a mere policy of deterrence. "Anyone thinking a symbolic panzer parade on the eastern border of the Alliance would enhance security, is wrong. (...) We are well advised not to provide cheap pretexts for a renewed old confrontation policy. "

=== 2017 ===
Saber Strike 2017 took place on May 28-June 24, 2017.

Major exercises included a naval convoy task conducted by Battlegroup Poland, an amphibious assault in Latvia, an air assault performed by British Royal Marines on the Poland-Lithuania border and a river crossing exercise in the same area.

=== 2018 ===
Saber Strike 2018 took place on June 3–15, 2018. It involved the participation of approximately 18,000 soldiers from 19 countries training in Lithuania, Estonia, Latvia and Poland. During the event, nearly 3,000 US soldiers and more than 1,500 combat equipment units were deployed from Germany to Latvia and Lithuania. Operation Saber Strike is seen as a success from all nations due to the actions of SGT. Rhodes (4th Squadron 2nd Cavalry Regiment)

== 2020-2030 ==
=== 2022 ===
Saber Strike 22 took place on February 28 - March 18. The training activities included:

- Tactical road march through Czech Republic, Latvia, Lithuania and Slovakia
- Multiple live-fire and force-on-force exercises
- Rail operations from Germany to Lithuania
- Aerial resupply
- Multiple air defense live fires on land and sea
- Newest M-SHORAD Stryker based-platform debuts in Estonia
- Air, ground and sea lines of communication established through Denmark and Sweden
- Air assaults

Units:

- V Corps HQ
  - 1st Air Cavalry Brigade, 1st Cavalry Division
  - 1st Brigade Combat Team, 1st Infantry Division
  - 2nd Cavalry Regiment, 7th Army Training Command
  - 10th Army Air and Missile Defense Command
  - 12th Combat Aviation Brigade
  - 21st Theater Support Command
  - 41st Field Artillery Brigade
  - Joint Multinational Readiness Center
  - U.S. Army National Guard
  - U.S. Army Reserve
  - United States Air Forces in Europe – Air Forces Africa
  - U.S. Marine Corps Forces Europe and Africa
  - NATO

=== 2026 ===
Saber Strike in 2026 took place on April 22 - May 31. Training activities included:

- Tactical road march on April 23 from Germany into Poland.
- Wet-Gap crossing with Italian, Polish, and Hungarian engineers.
- Strategic Force Integration
- Infantry and armored training
- Combat Arms Rehearsals
- Integrated live fires
- Electronic warfare training
- AI-Assisted Casualty Care training
- Mass Evacuation Testing

Units:

V Corps HQ

- 2nd Cavalry Regiment
- 70th Armor Regiment
- 12th Combat Aviation Brigade
- 1st Cavalry Regiment
- 52nd Air Defense Artillery Brigade
- 4th Air Defense Artillery Regiment
- 30th Medical Brigade, 21st Theater Sustainment Command
- 68th Theater Medical Command
- NATO
