= Clandestine chemistry =

Illegal preparation of chemicals

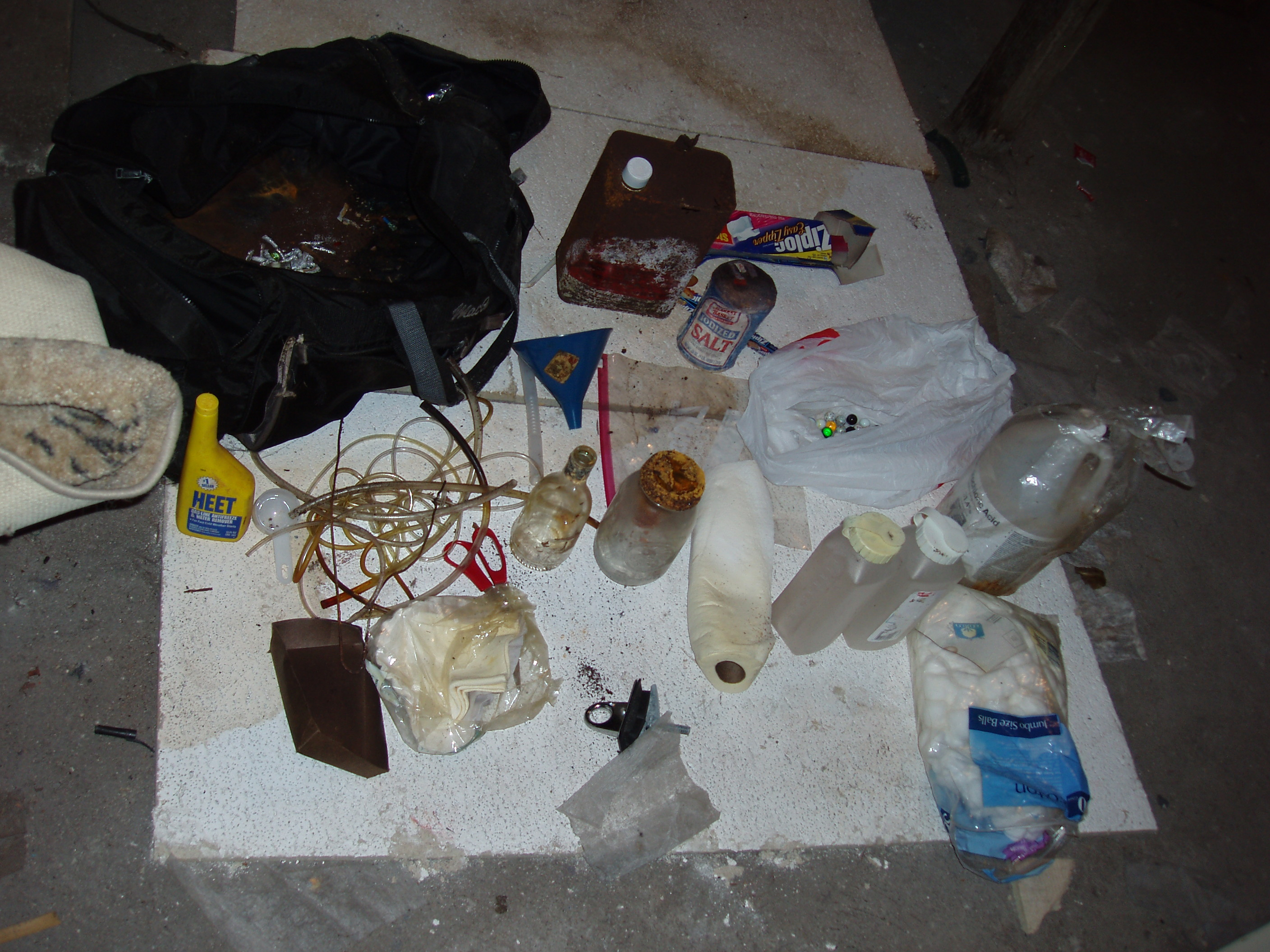
Items found at a meth production lab in Fitchburg, Massachusetts in June 2009

Clandestine chemistry refers to chemistry performed in secret, typically to avoid regulatory attention.

Most clandestine chemistry supplies the illegal drug trade, both historically and today. Larger labs are run by organized crime, which then distributes product on the black market. Smaller labs can be run by individual chemists.

However, not all clandestine chemistry manufactures illegal drugs. Hobbyist chemists may work clandestinely on projects that would be legal if overt, in order to skimp on records, insurance premia, or safety controls.

== History ==
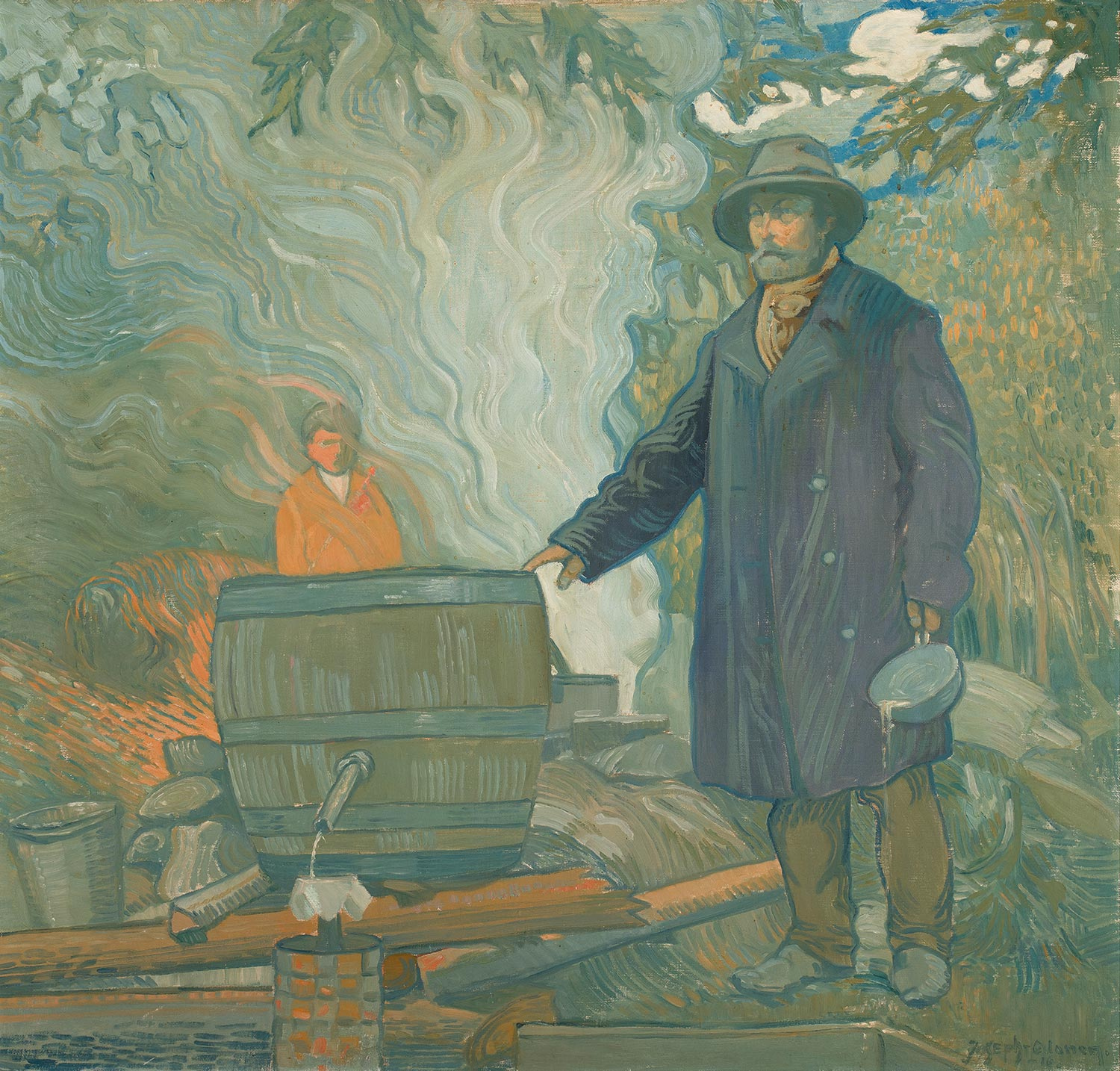
Moonshiner by Finnish painter Joseph Alanen (1916)

Ancient forms of clandestine chemistry included the manufacturing of explosives.

From 1919 to 1933, the United States prohibited the sale, manufacture, or transportation of alcoholic beverages. This opened a door for brewers to supply their own town with alcohol. Just like modern-day drug labs, distilleries were placed in rural areas. The term moonshine originally referred to "corn whiskey", that is, a whiskey-like liquor made in secret from corn. Today, American-made corn whiskey can be labeled or sold under that name, or as bourbon or Tennessee whiskey, depending on the details of the production process.

Clandestine chemistry for non-alcoholic purposes first came to public attention in the late 1960s, as a large number of substances entered into regulatory controls. For example, amphetamines were not controlled substances in the United States until October 27, 1970. Prior to this, amphetamine sulfate had first been widely available as an over-the-counter (OTC) nasal decongestant, marketed as benzedrine. By 1959 its popularity as a therapeutic agent and also an illicit drug had skyrocketed nationwide, causing the Federal Bureau of Narcotics (FBN) to reclassify amphetamine from OTC to prescription-only.

In the 1980s and early 1990s, most methamphetamine production in the United States occurred in small independent laboratories. The do-it-yourself meth production reflected a broader rural culture of self-reliance for hunting, fishing, and vehicle and house repair. Underground chemists developed manufacturing techniques based on ephedrine or pseudoephedrine reduction to make methamphetamine. At the time, neither was a watched chemical, and pills containing the substance could be bought by the thousands without raising any kind of suspicion.

This small-holder market structure changed after federal regulations in 1988 enabled the DEA to more closely track the ephedrine and pseudoephedrine precursors. In May 1995, the DEA shut down two major suppliers of precursors in the United States, seizing 25 metric tons of ephedrine and pseudoephedrine from Clifton Pharmaceuticals and 500 cases of pseudoephedrine from X-Pressive Looks, Inc. (XLI). The immediate market impact suggests that they had been providing more than 50 percent of the precursors used nationally to produce methamphetamine. However, the market rapidly rebounded. In the mid-1990s as Mexican organized crime became a major player in its production and distribution, operating "super-labs" which produced a substantial percentage of the drugs being sold.

== Chemical control ==
Government drug and explosive regulation generally relies on tight control over chemical precursors to disrupt production before contraband enters the market. However, many compounds are dual-use: they have applications in both illicit drug and consumer product manufacture. Governments often require specific licenses and strict record-keeping for large purchases of these chemicals in legitimate commerce. Diversion to illegal ends therefore often involves mislabeling shipments or forging documents, establishing front companies, hijacking or stealing shipments, bribing officials, or smuggling products across international borders.

=== International cooperation ===
The Multilateral Chemical Reporting Initiative encourages governments to voluntarily exchange information to monitor chemical shipments. International bodies on the topic include the UN Commission on Narcotic Drugs, the Inter-American Drug Control Abuse Commission (CICAD), and the International Narcotics Control Board (INCB).

In June 2015, the European Commission approved Regulation (EU) 2015/1013, a plan to monitor drug precursors traded between the Union and third countries. The Regulation also establishes uniform procedures for licensing and registration of operators and users who are listed in a European database tracking drug precursors.

=== Acetic anhydride ===
The US DEA's Operation Topaz is a coordinated international strategy, with 31 participants, targeting acetic anhydride. Heroin-producing countries unavoidably consume acetic anhydride from the international market (the compound is virtually irreplaceable), and, according to the DEA, Mexico is the only acetic anhydride source for Afghan heroin laboratories. Authorities in Uzbekistan, Turkmenistan, Kyrgyzstan, and Kazakhstan routinely seize ton-quantity shipments of diverted acetic anhydride.

== Equipment ==
The simplest forms of clandestine chemistry generally require little equipment beyond kitchen appliances. Larger-scale or more dangerous preparations may be performed in moveable vehicles to hide from inspection and launder gases released, a phenomenon called "rolling labs".

=== Distillation ===
An old form of clandestine chemistry is the illegal brewing and distillation of alcohol. This is frequently done to avoid taxation on spirits.

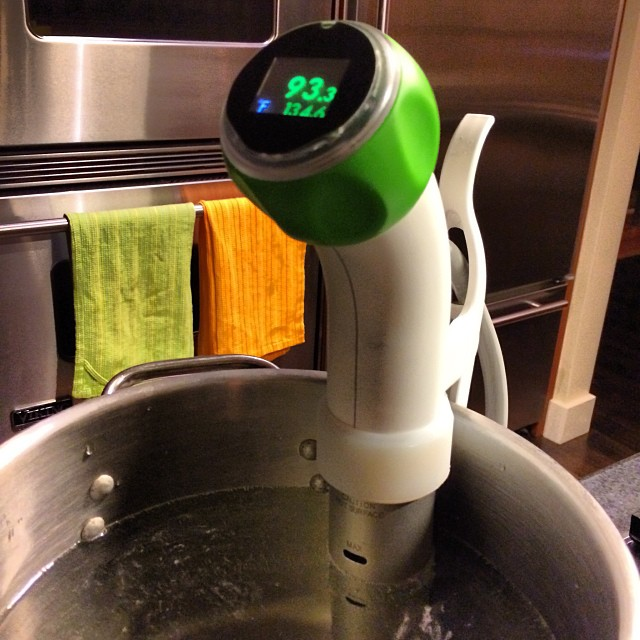
A thermal immersion circulator, like this sous vide stick, is used to evaporate ethanol in plastic stills or spiral stills.

In some jurisdictions, moonshine stills are illegal to sell, import, and own without permission. However, it is relatively straightforward to repurpose household equipment into an illicit still.

=== Rolling labs ===
A rolling meth lab is a transportable laboratory that is used for the illegal manufacture of the drug methamphetamine. Rolling meth labs are often moved to a secluded location where the strong fumes of methamphetamine manufacture will go undetected, and where the toxic manufacturing byproducts can be discarded. They are sometimes designed to manufacture the drug while the lab is traveling.

== Dangers ==
The chemicals involved in clandestine chemistry can explode. Clandestine meth manufacture has been implicated in both house and wild land fires. Explosive nitrate esters such as nitroglycerin and EGDN, and organic peroxides such as acetone peroxide and HMTD, are easy to produce from common household chemicals.

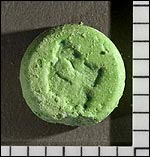
An impure tablet sold as MDMA seized by law enforcement in the United States. The tablet was determined to contain no MDMA; instead, it contained a mixture of BZP, methamphetamine, and caffeine.

Due to regulatory restrictions (see § Chemical control), clandestine chemists typically use impure or ersatz feedstocks. If drugs, the products are also often too impure to safely consume (even beyond the inherent dangers of substance abuse). For example:

- Bolivian cocaine manufacturers use cement instead of lime and sodium bicarbonate instead of ammonia as bases, and fuels such as gasoline, kerosene and diesel fuel for solvents. Some laboratories cannot use sulfuric acid during leaf maceration, and extract less cocaine alkaloid from the leaf.
- Black tar heroin is a heroin-like opioid mixture produced when manufacturers are forced to use weaker acetylating agents than acetic anhydride.
- Moonshine is infamous for contamination; see Moonshine by country § By contaminated moonshine
- Illicitly produced desomorphine ("krokodil") is typically far from pure and often contains large amounts of toxic contaminants from the "cooking" process. Injecting the mixture can cause serious damage to the skin, blood vessels, bone and muscles, sometimes requiring limb amputation in long-term users. Another contaminant, 1-methyl-4-phenylpyridinium, is a neurotoxin, and causes rapid irreversible damage similar to Parkinson's disease.
- Embalming fluid has been found as a by-product of PCP manufacture.

=== Cleanup ===
Clandestine chemistry sites may become contaminated with industrial wastes and require substantial remediation before they can return to their design use.

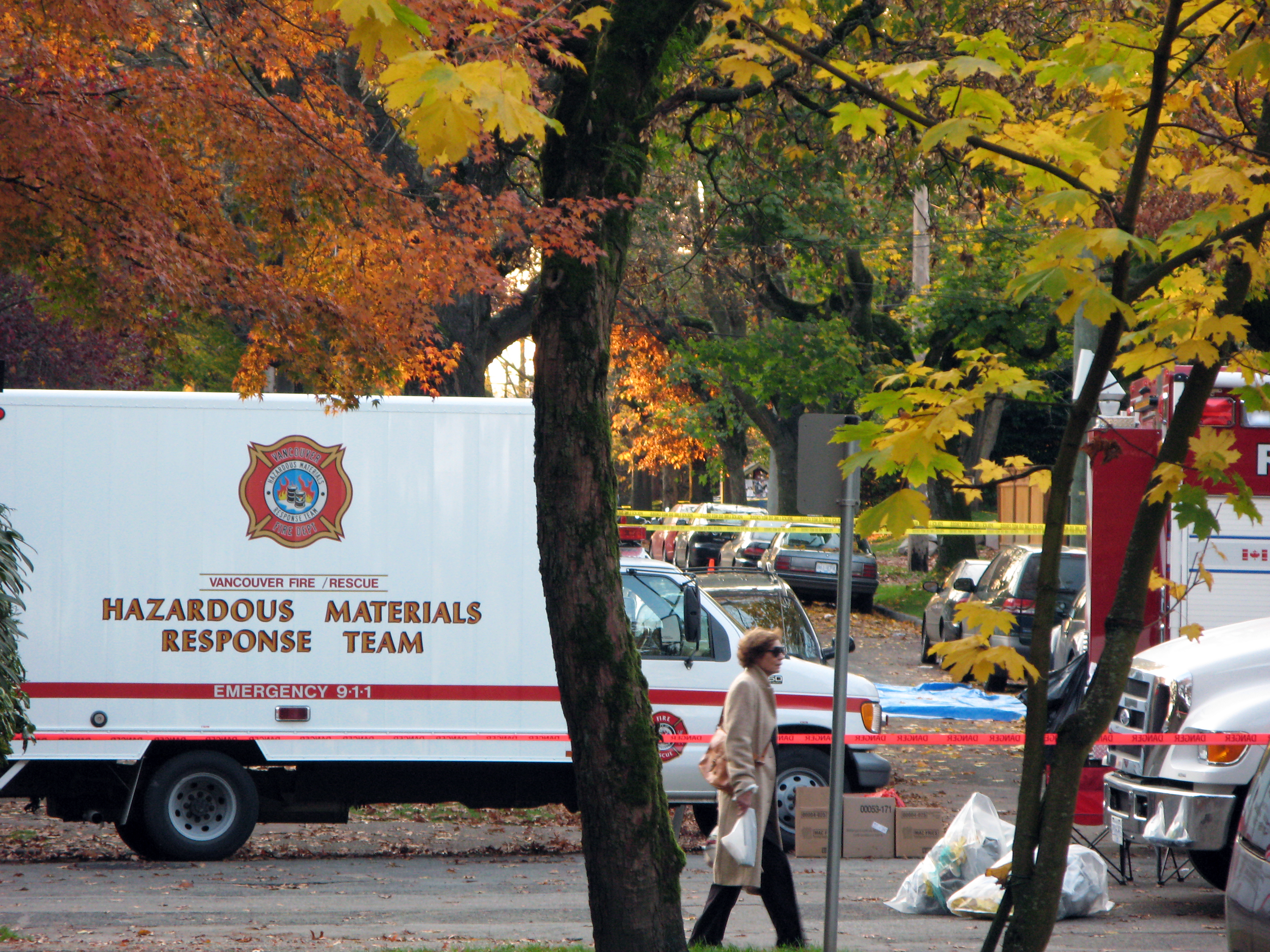
Hazmat team attending a meth lab cleanup in Vancouver, British Columbia in 2007

In the US, the process is most clearly delineated for the remediation of methamphetamine labs. The EPA standardized that making a former meth lab site safer for habitation requires two basic efforts:

Gross chemical removal
Law enforcement or a DEA contractors removes the obvious dangers from the site. Obvious dangers include containers of chemicals, equipment, and apparatuses. This process does not cleanup or remove chemical spills, stains or residue; a gross chemical removal alone does not suffice to make a property fit for habitation.
Clandestine remediation
The cleaning of interior structures and, if applicable, the surrounding land, surface waters and groundwater by an EPA approved or National Crime Scene Cleanup Association certified company. A property that has been remediated should present minimal to no health risk to occupants.

== Famous clandestine chemists ==
- Uncle Fester, author of Secrets of Methamphetamine Manufacture
- Owsley Stanley, first large-scale manufacturer of LSD
- William Leonard Pickard, largest-known manufacturer of LSD
- Nicholas Sand, supplier to The Brotherhood of Eternal Love
- Kary Mullis, Nobel Prize winner (for non-clandestine work)

== See also ==
- The Hive (website)
- Rolling meth lab
- Cold water extraction
- DEA list of chemicals
- Breaking Bad
