= Bio Recovery =

American company that handles crime scene and bio-hazard cleanups

- Industry: Bio-hazard and Crime scene cleanup
- Founded: 1998
- Founder: Ron Gospodarski
- Key people: Victoria Vallone (CEO)
- Website: www.biorecovery.com

Bio Recovery is an American company that handles crime scene and bio-hazard cleanups. The company assisted in the clean-up of the apartment of Craig Spencer, who worked with Doctors Without Borders, when he contracted Ebola, as well as a bowling alley he visited in New York.

== History ==
Ron Gospodarski founded Bio Recovery Corporation in 1998 out of his apartment. Previously, he was a volunteer paramedic, and worked as operations manager in a Queens district attorney's office for six years. After Ron Gospodarski died, the company was inherited by his sister, Fran Gospodarski, who later sold off the company to a local competitor, All Island Bio Recovery and Restoration, located in Ronkonkoma, New York.

== Work ==
Bio Recovery has cleaned accidents, suicide and homicide scenes, hoarding situations, anthrax outbreaks, sewage overflow, and other bio-hazard situations. A cleanup requires personal protective gear including a Hazmat suit or single-use non-porous suits, double-filter respirators and chemical spill boots.

Bio Recovery worked on the 2000 Wendy's massacre in Flushing, Queens where five employees were killed during a robbery orchestrated by a manager and former employee. The cleanup took 65 certified technicians and two weeks to finish. The company also handled the crime scene clean for the triple murder above the Carnegie Deli in Manhattan. In 2001, Mayor Rudy Giuliani hired Bio Recovery to remove anthrax from several New York buildings. The company also cleaned anthrax from the ABC-TV headquarters. In 2003, the Regal Princess, a cruise ship struck by the Norwalk virus, was handled by Gospodarski and his team.

The company worked on the beating of Glenn Moore by Nicholas "Fat Nick" Minucci in June 2005 and the murder of ex-cop Raymond Sheehan in February 2008. In January 2009, it worked on a home in Springfield Gardens, Queens when Vivian Squires, 86, was attacked by an intruder who she tried to fight off. The company has also worked for large corporations including Marriott Hotels, Burger King, and CVS Pharmacies.

== Alec Baldwin “Rust” Shooting Incident Cleanup ==
In 2021, Bio Recovery was contracted to manage the cleanup of the set of the film Rust following the accidental shooting that resulted in the death of cinematographer Halyna Hutchins.

== Hiring During the Pandemic ==
During the COVID-19 pandemic, Bio Recovery distinguished itself by ramping up its hiring efforts at a time when many companies were downsizing or halting operations. As the demand for specialized cleaning services surged due to heightened concerns over biohazard contamination, Bio Recovery responded by expanding its workforce.

== The Soul Mediators (Social Media) ==
In 2023, Bio Recovery's social media presence gained attention through the TikTok account "The Soul Mediators." This account, managed by Bio Recovery's team, showcases the intricacies and challenges of crime scene cleanup, offering a glimpse into the profession. The TikTok account has been featured in several media outlets, including A&E's Real Crime, New York Post, and Business Insider, highlighting its role in demystifying the field of biohazard remediation.

== Ebola cleanup ==
In October 2014, Bio Recovery worked to decontaminate the apartment in Harlem that belonged to Dr. Craig Spencer, a doctor at NewYork–Presbyterian Hospital who worked with Doctors Without Borders to treat Ebola. The doctor contracted Ebola, and the company was responsible for cleaning his apartment. The company also cleaned Gutter, a bowling alley Spencer had visited. The state department of Health and Mental Hygiene checked on Bio-Recovery's work after it was done, the spokesman said, "and found the cleanup was successfully performed and executed"

Controversy later erupted after it was reported that the company's chief safety officer, Sal Pane, had a history of fraud accusations and had misled the city about his experience with bio-hazardous cleanups.

Following the Ebola cleanup in New York City, revelations slowly trickled out revealing a pattern of Controversy from the company. Documents released months after the cleanup, including emails with city officials, revealed that the company claimed to have had training it didn't have at the time of the cleanup. Following media investigations into the company, claims of certifications were taken down from the company's website. The company also claimed to be working for the United States Army, which was denied by the Department of Defense and army medical officials.
