= Operation United Assistance =

2014 US anti-Ebola military mission in West Africa

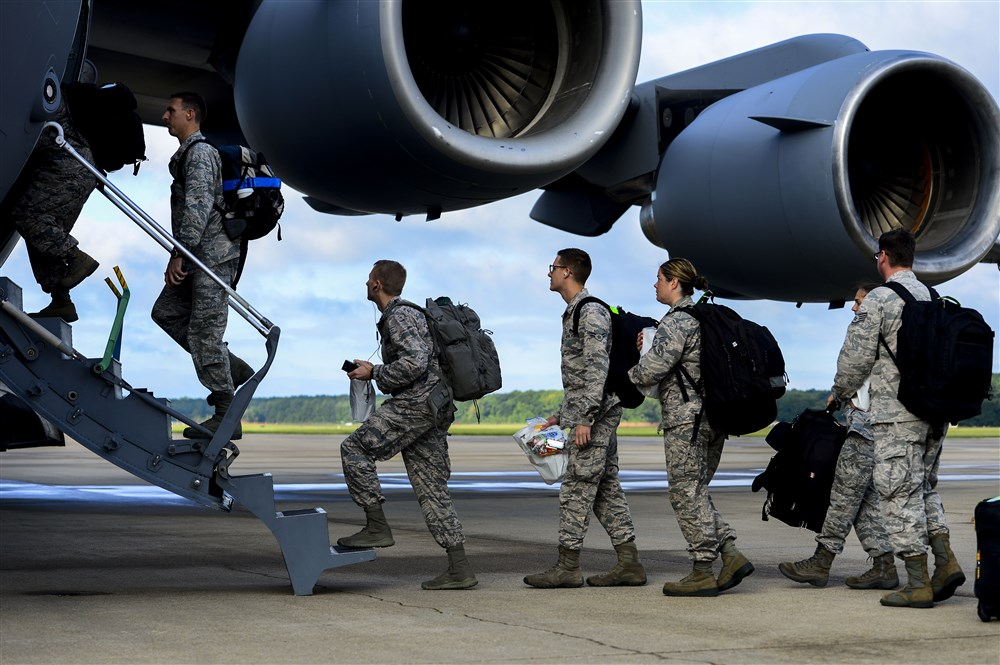
Troops bound for Monrovia, Liberia board a transport aircraft (September 2014)

Operation United Assistance was a 2014 United States military mission to help combat the Ebola virus epidemic in West Africa, including the part of the epidemic occurring in Liberia. The 101st Airborne Division headquarters was responsible for leading the mission.

== History ==
Barack Obama calls Ebola a national security priority and announces the US will establish a military command center in Liberia. United States Department of Defense video, September 17, 2014

The United States Africa Command, working through United States Army Africa, has designated the Army's response to the Ebola epidemic as Operation United Assistance. Up to 4,000 U.S. Army troops are planned as part of an aid mission there, starting September 2014. Initially, the overall plan was to build 17 hospitals around the country of Liberia, each with 100-bed capacity. However, in late November 2014 this was reduced to 10 treatment centers with 50 beds each. By early January 2015, 8 out of 10 centers were completed. This type of hospital is called an Ebola Treatment Unit or ETU for short. The military is also working with USAID.

A 25-bed hospital planned for health workers staffed by U.S. Public Health Service Commissioned Corps officers was opened November 7, 2014, near Monrovia.

=== Deployment ===
General David Rodriguez briefs reporters on Operation United Assistance, October 8, 2014

By the end of September 2014 150 military personnel were helping USAID in the capital, Monrovia. Special isolation units for the C-17 Globemaster aircraft are being worked on in late 2014 to support medical evacuation of personnel should they be infected. The current evacuation aircraft can only carry one patient at time, while the isolation unit is being designed to support up to 15.

By early October there about 400 troops were in Liberia. This included soldiers from an Engineering Battalion, to help construct buildings for the operation. Initial work included transporting supplies to Liberia, and scouting out sites to build the treatment centers. By December 2014, there were three thousand servicemembers deployed for the operation; by February 2015, the number of servicemembers dropped to around thirteen hundred. In early April 2015, 48th Chemical Biological Radiological Nuclear Brigade deployed to Liberia to oversee the draw down of the operation.

== Monrovia Medical Unit ==
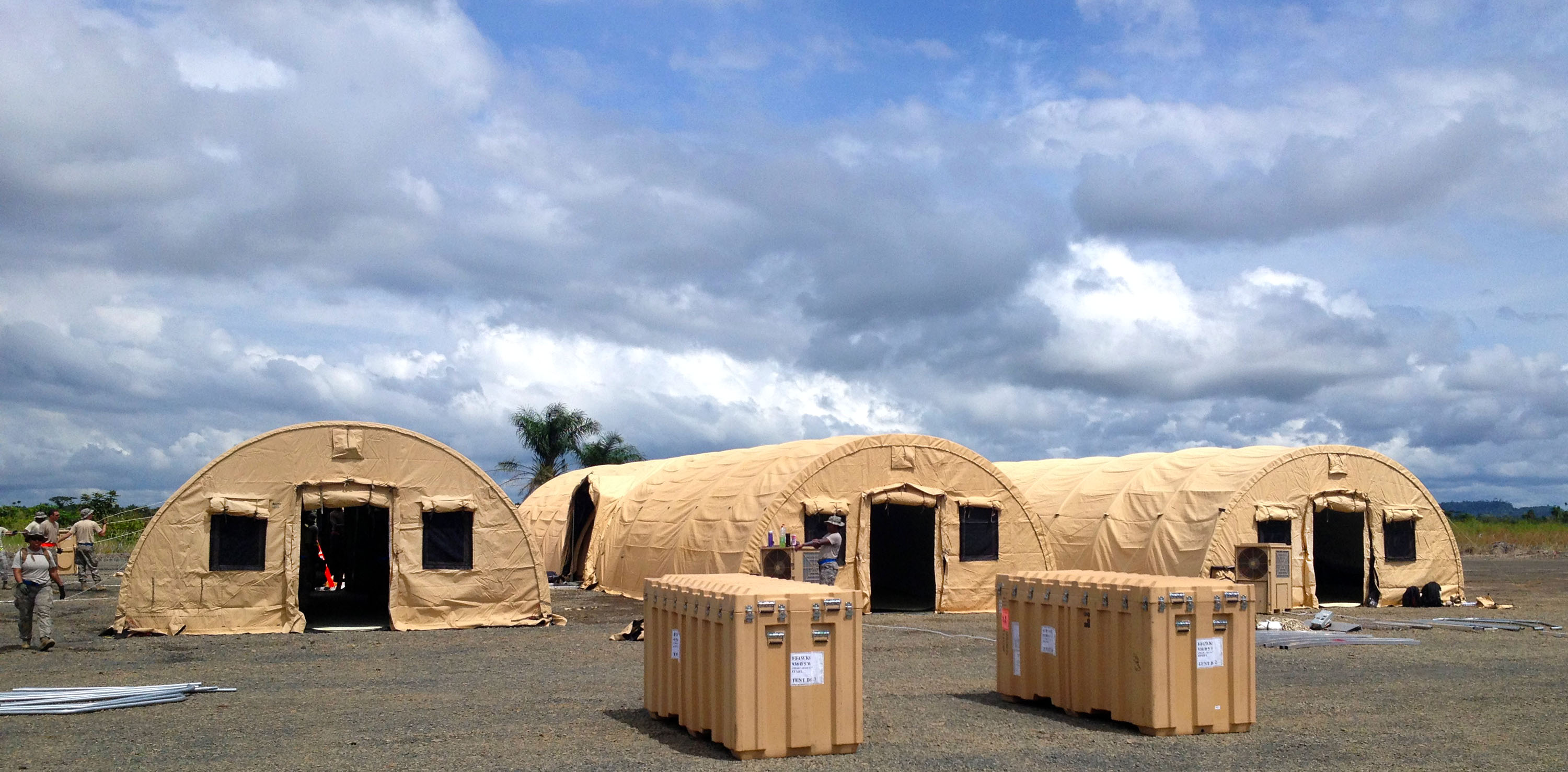
The 25-bed Monrovia Medical Unit was constructed for health care workers supporting Operation United Assistance.

The Monrovia Medical Unit is a 25-bed field hospital for local health care workers, that opened in November 2014 in Liberia in response to the Ebola epidemic there. Hundreds of health workers from Liberia and West Africa have died from the disease, and it is hoped the hospital will be an encouragement to volunteers. By October 2014 construction of the buildings for one 25-bed hospital was finished, called the Monrovia Medical Unit. The plan was for US. Public Health Service officers to take care of Ebola-infected health care workers at the 25-bed facility. The staff was to come from members of the U.S. Public Health Service Commissioned Corps. By October 19, it was reported that 223 health care workers had cases of Ebola in Liberia, and 103 of them had died.

On 7 November 2014, a new air-conditioned 25-bed hospital was opened for West African health care workers.

== Precautions and quarantine ==
Although U.S. troops will not be assigned to provide care for Ebola patients, rigorous precautions to protect them from the virus will be put in place. On 17 October 2014, Marine Corps Maj. Gen. James Lariviere told Congress that "We have a no-touch policy and a three-foot separation rule with local nationals"..."A typical soldier’s day will be to get up, have their temperature taken, go out and perform whatever task they are there to do. They will only eat approved food and drink bottled water and wash their hands in chlorine solution. When they get back to their compounds, they will have their temperature taken and do a chlorine wash again."

The Chief of Staff of the United States Army, Raymond T. Odierno, ordered on October 27 a 21-day quarantine of all soldiers returning from Operation United Assistance. Up to 12 soldiers have been quarantined so far in a U.S. base in Italy.

== See also ==
- Expeditionary Medical Support System
- Operation Unified Assistance (for the 2004 Indian Ocean tsunami)
- Operation Unified Response (for the 2010 Haiti earthquake)
