= Expeditionary Medical Support System =

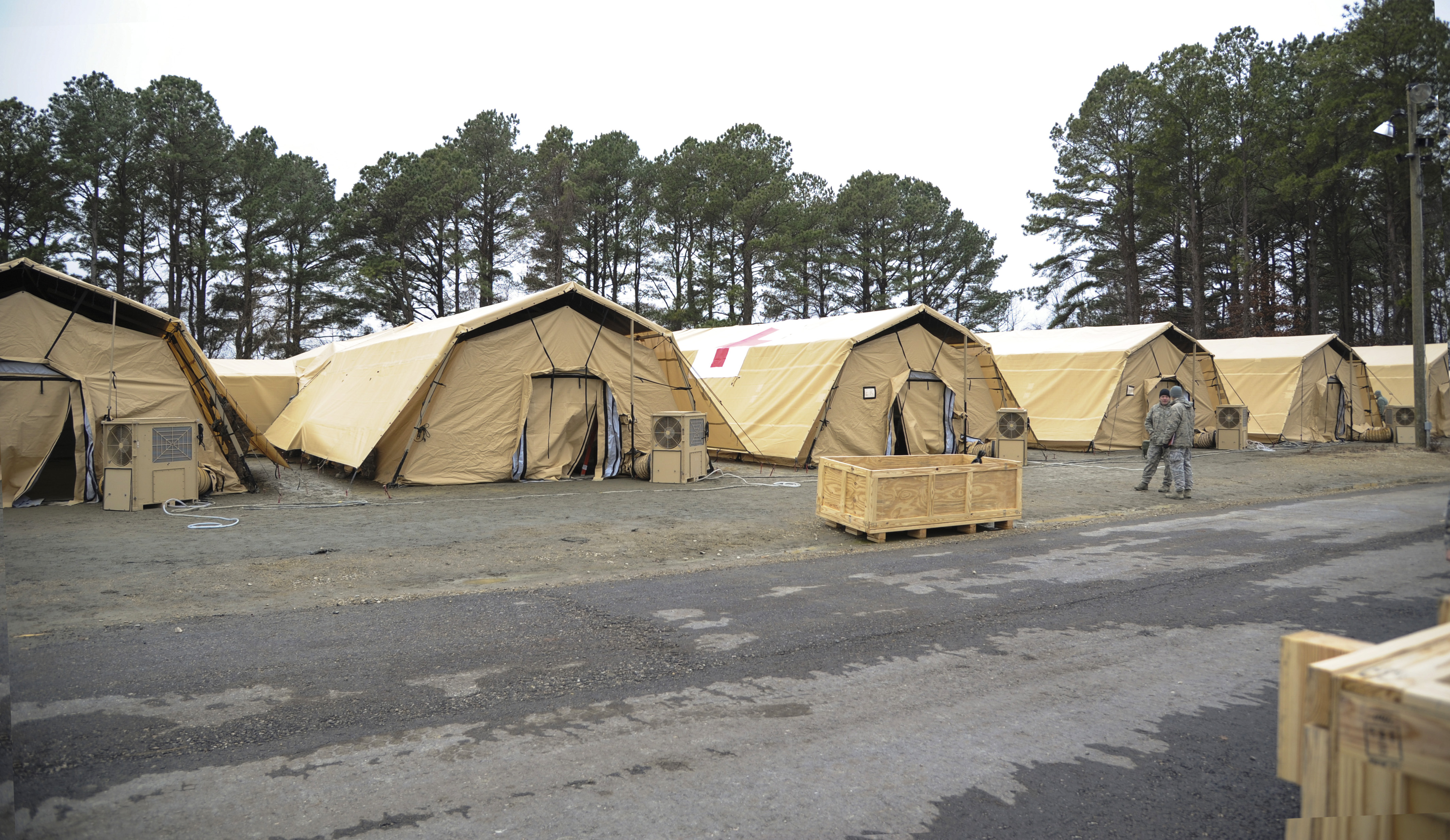
A new EMEDS tent structure being tested at Langley AFB in 2014

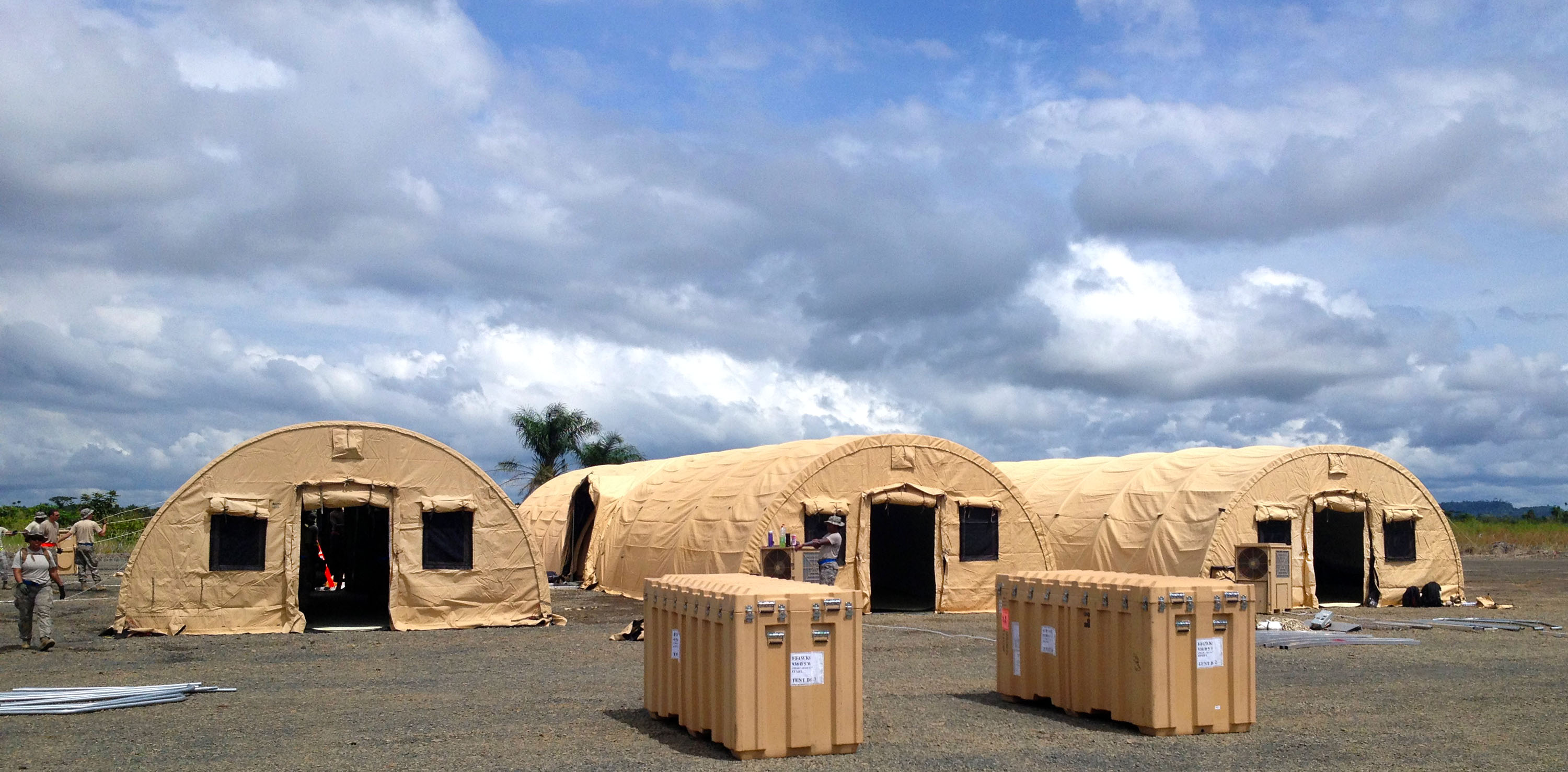
The 25-bed Monrovia Medical Unit was constructed for health care workers supporting Operation United Assistance.

The Expeditionary Medical Support System (EMEDS) is a modular field hospital system developed by the U.S. military for mobile deployment of medical treatment facilities in any location.

EMEDS consists of a variety of modular, medical response packages and equipment that can be used in multiple geographical operations and situations such as wartime contingencies, humanitarian assistance, and disaster relief. The EMEDS team is equipped and staffed to provide forward stabilization, primary care, dental services, and force health protection.

In late September 2014, the U.S. military sent 4,000 troops to Africa to establish treatment centers to support the medical campaign to defeat the Ebola virus epidemic in West Africa in an operation called Operation United Assistance. The troops are tasked with building EMEDS modular hospitals. Plans included building a 25-bed hospital for health care workers and 17 treatment centers with 100 beds each.
