= Andrea Marzi =

German-American virologist

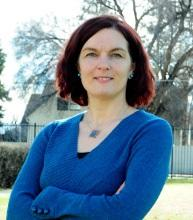
- Education: University of Erlangen–Nuremberg (PhD)
- Awards: Loeffler-Frosch medal (2019)
- Scientific career
- Fields: Immunobiology, molecular virology
- Workplaces: National Microbiology Laboratory; Rocky Mountain Laboratories
- Thesis: The role of cellular attachment factors for filovirus infection (2007)
- Doctoral advisor: Uwe Sonnewald

Andrea Marzi is a German-American virologist. She is chief of the immunobiology and molecular virology unit at the Rocky Mountain Laboratories. Marzi investigates the pathogenesis of filoviruses and vaccine development. She received the Loeffler-Frosch medal in recognition of her research.

== Education ==
In 2007, Marzi received a Ph.D. in virology from the University of Erlangen–Nuremberg where she studied the glycoprotein-mediated entry of Ebola virus (EBOV) and HIV. Her doctoral advisor was Uwe Sonnewald. Her dissertation was titled The role of cellular attachment factors for filovirus infection. Later that year, Marzi moved to Winnipeg to join Heinz Feldmann’s group at the National Microbiology Laboratory to work in the Biological Safety Level 4 (BSL4) on filoviruses and EBOV vaccines.

== Career ==
In 2008, Marzi moved with Feldmann to the Rocky Mountain Laboratories and continued her BSL4 work on vaccine development for highly pathogenic viruses using primarily the vesicular stomatitis virus (VSV) platform. She also studied the pathogenesis of filoviruses and developed small animal models for these pathogens. Recently, she expanded the VSV vaccine platform to other emerging pathogens like Zika virus. In 2013, Marzi was promoted to staff scientist, and in 2017 to associate scientist. Marzi was selected as a tenure-track investigator in the National Institute of Allergy and Infectious Diseases Laboratory of Virology in 2019. She is chief of the immunobiology and molecular virology unit.

== Awards and honors ==
In 2019, the German Society of Virology recognized Marzi with the Loeffler-Frosch medal for her research on filoviruses and vaccine development.
