= Emmie de Wit =

Dutch-American virologist

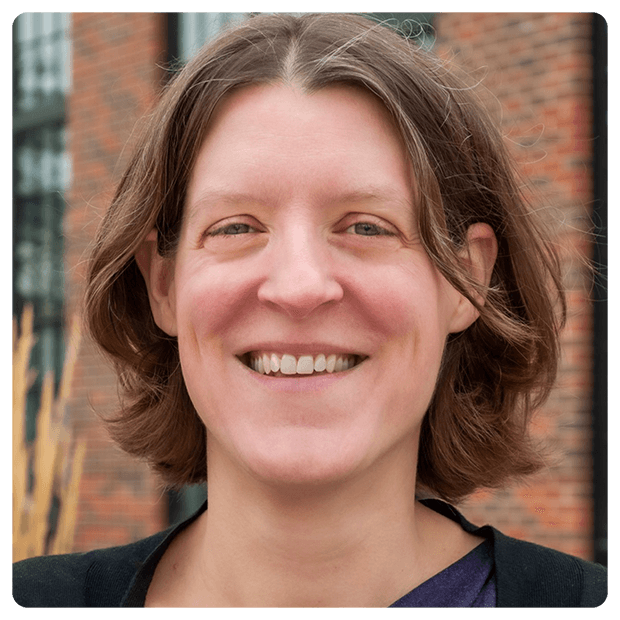
- Education: Erasmus University Rotterdam (PhD)
- Spouse: Vincent Munster (m. 2009)
- Awards: Golden Goose Award (2020)
- Scientific career
- Fields: Viral pathogenesis
- Workplaces: Rocky Mountain Laboratories

Emmie de Wit is a Dutch-American virologist. She is chief of the molecular pathogenesis unit at the Rocky Mountain Laboratories. Her research combines pathogenesis studies with detailed molecular analyses to identify molecular determinants of severe respiratory tract disease within the virus and the host.

== Education ==
Emmie de Wit is from the Netherlands. She received her Ph.D. in virology in 2006 from Erasmus University Rotterdam. Her research focused on the replication, pathogenesis and transmission of influenza A virus. Her dissertation was titled Molecular determinants of influenza A virus replication and pathogenesis.

== Career ==
In 2009, de Wit moved to Heinz Feldmann's Laboratory of Virology at the Rocky Mountain Laboratories (RML) to research in the biosafety level 4 laboratory. Here, she focused on the pathogenesis of and countermeasures against Nipah virus, the Middle East Respiratory Syndrome Coronavirus and the 1918 H1N1 influenza A virus (Spanish flu). In 2012, she received a Fellows Award for Research Excellence (FARE) for her research on modeling the transmission cycle of the deadly Nipah virus. From 2014 to 2015, de Wit spent 4 months in a field lab in Monrovia, Liberia in charge of patient diagnostics for several Ebola Treatment Units in the area, to help contain the Ebola virus epidemic in Liberia. Currently, de Wit's research aims to combine pathogenesis studies with detailed molecular analyses to identify molecular determinants of severe respiratory tract disease within the virus and the host. She is chief of the molecular pathogenesis unit at RML.

In 2020, de Wit was named as a co-recipient of a Golden Goose Award for excellence in federally funded research with Kizzmekia Corbett, Barney Graham and her spouse Vincent Munster.

== Personal life ==
While a PhD student at Erasmus University Rotterdam, de Wit met researcher Vincent Munster, whom she married in 2009. Munster has a separate research lab at Rocky Mountain Laboratories and is also a virologist.
