= Vincent Munster =

American virologist

Vincent Munster is the Chief of the Virus Ecology Unit in the Laboratory of Virology at Rocky Mountain Laboratories in Hamilton, Montana.

== Education ==
Munster received his PhD in virology in 2006 from Erasmus University Rotterdam in the Netherlands. He studied under Ab Osterhaus and Ron Fouchier.

== Career ==
In 2008, Munster traveled to the Netherlands Arctic Station, located on Spitsbergen, the northernmost village in the world, where he sampled birds and geese for influenza. In 2009, Munster moved to Rocky Mountain Laboratories. Around 2011, his laboratory started using Syrian Golden hamster's (Mesocricetus auratus) for disease transmission research.

Munster's lab is built around the concept of integrating fieldwork, experimental work, and computational modeling to study bat viruses in their natural, intermediate, and human hosts. In 2018, Munster won two DARPA PREEMPT projects using self-spreading bat vaccine technology. In December 2018, Munster co-published with Ralph Baric an Egyptian fruit bat infection study.

In 2026 Munster was charged with smuggling mpox (Monkeypox).

== Awards ==
In 2020, Munster and his wife, Emmie de Wit, were conferred the Golden Goose Award.
