= Tibor Juhasz =

American-Hungarian physicist

- Born: Hungary
- Education: University of Szeged
- Known for: Pioneering application of femtosecond lasers for eye surgery; contributing to development of LASIK
- Scientific career
- Fields: Biomedical engineering; Ophthalmology; Laser medicine
- Workplaces: University of California, Irvine School of Medicine; University of Michigan; Intralase; Alcon; Vialase
- Thesis: Measurement of Optical Phonon Lifetime with Picosecond Pulses (1985)

Tibor Juhasz is an American-Hungarian physicist and entrepreneur. He is a professor of ophthalmology and biomedical engineering at the University of California, Irvine School of Medicine, as well as the President and CTO of the medical device company ViaLase.

Juhasz is best known for his work on medical applications of lasers. He and ophthalmology professor Ron Kurtz are the inventors of IntraLASIK, a device which uses femtosecond lasers to prepare the eye for LASIK surgery. IntraLASIK has since become standard procedure when performing LASIK surgery. Juhasz has also developed similar devices to treat cataracts and glaucoma.

Juhasz has also founded several companies to commercialize his inventions. Two of his companies, IntraLase and LenSx, were later acquired by major medical device companies for hundreds of millions of dollars. His third, ViaLase, is currently active; its product, a device which uses femtosecond lasers to treat glaucoma, is currently in the final stages of clinical trials.

Juhasz is the recipient of the 2002 Berthold Leibinger Innovation Prize for the development and commercialization of femtosecond laser surgical technology. He also received the 2022 Golden Goose Award from the American Association for the Advancement of Science and Association of American Universities for introducing femtosecond laser technology to ophthalmology.

== Education ==
Juhasz completed his Diploma in Physics from the University of Szeged in 1982. Four years later, he received a Ph.D. in Physics from the same institution. He completed his postdoctoral education at the Department of Physics and Astronomy at the University of California, Irvine from 1987 to 1990. Later, in 2001, he obtained a Doctor of Sciences degree from the Hungarian Academy of Sciences.

== Career ==
=== Early career ===
Juhasz began his academic career in 1982 as a research assistant in the Department of External Physics at the Technical University of Budapest (BME). In 1985, was made an assistant professor. He stayed at BME for two more years, before leaving in 1987 to complete a postdoc with the Department of Physics at the University of California, Irvine. It was during this time that Juhasz began to investigate the interactions between ultrashort laser pulses and matter. Three years later, in 1990, he was promoted to the role of Assistant Researcher Physicist.

=== Femtosecond lasers in corneal surgery ===
Juhasz left UC Irvine in 1994. Two years later, in 1996, he met ophthamologist Ron Kurtz at a conference in Toronto. At the time, Kurtz was collaborating with a team of researchers at the University of Michigan (UMich) on a project investigating the potential applications of femotsecond lasers in ophthalmology. Juhasz, who was investigating the use of picosecond lasers for eye surgery, struck up a conversation with Kurtz, and soon Juhasz was invited to join the UMich team.

Juhasz remained at UMich for eight more years, rising to the rank of associate professor in 1998. During his time at the university, he and Kurtz developed a device that used femotsecond lasers to create a flap in the cornea, a necessary first step for many kinds of eye surgery, including LASIK. At the time, corneal flaps had to be created surgically with a microkeratome knife, a process that was both painful for the patient and had an extended recovery period. Their invention, which they named IntraLASIK, allowed the procedure to be performed bladelessly, greatly reducing both the pain involved and the recovery period afterwards. Juhasz would go on to win the Berthold Leibinger Innovation Prize for his work in 2002.

In 1997, the two men founded the company IntraLase to commercialize IntraLASIK. Upon receiving FDA approval, the device became the first commercially available ophthalmic femtosecond laser. Juhasz initially served as the company's vice president for R&D until 2002, when he became its chief technology officer (CTO). During this time, Juhasz returned to UC Irvine, accepting the role of professor at the Gavin Herbert Eye Institute in the Department of Biomedical Engineering in 2004. His research there showed that IntraLASIK offered enhanced safety and yields superior refractive outcomes in comparison to the conventional microkeratome method. Furthermore, his work established that employing femtosecond laser technology for corneal transplantation offers distinct benefits in comparison to conventional methods.

=== Femtosecond laser cataract surgery ===
In 2007, IntraLase was acquired by Advanced Medical Optics for $808 million. After its sale, Juhasz and Kurtz began investigating other potential ophthalmic applications of femtosecond lasers. The two collaborated with Hungarian researcher Zoltan Nagy to design and develop the first clinical cataract femtosecond laser. Later research by Juhasz would demonstrate that the mechanical strength of femtosecond laser capsulotomy is on par with that of manual capsulotomy, but with a significantly reduced variability in strength. Consequently, these studies significantly decreased the likelihood and rate of capsular tears and other complications.

Juhasz and Kurtz once again founded a company, LenSx Lasers, to commercialize their new invention. LenSx Lasers would eventually be acquired by Alcon for $316.5 million in 2010. Juhasz stayed on after the sale, serving as vice president of R&D for Alcon's LenSx division until 2016.

During this time period, Juhasz also contributed to research in the field of corneal biomechanics and in the field of the treatment of keratoconus.

=== Femtosecond laser treatment for glaucoma ===
After leaving Alcon, Juhasz turned his attention towards another potential ophthalmic use for femtosecond lasers: treating glaucoma. Juhasz had made his first attempt at developing a glaucoma treatment the mid-1990s, when he undertook a research project supported by the National Institutes of Health (NIH) that aimed to reduce intraocular pressure by establishing partial thickness channels from the front chamber to the area beneath the conjunctiva through the sclera. Although the channels proved to be efficient, his early animal experiments showed a swift healing response, which subsequently constrained the long-term efficacy of these treatments.

Even at the time, Juhasz had believed that these issues could be resolved once femtosecond laser technology had sufficiently improved. So in 2017, Juhasz resumed his research. With the improved technology at his disposal, he was able to develop a micron-resolution OCT imaging technology. Later, he demonstrated that by using micron-resolution OCT imaging, it is possible to precisely identify the trabecular meshwork and create precise drainage pathways that connect the anterior chamber to Schlemm's canal. Additionally, he showed in preserved human cadaver eyes that the femtosecond laser-generated drainage pathways have the potential to reduce intraocular pressure.

However, by 2017, the technology had improved sufficiently to allow his team to develop a treatment. That same year, Juhasz founded the company ViaLase to commercialize this latest invention. He currently serves as the company's President and CTO. In initial human trials, ViaLase's eponymous glaucoma treatment demonstrated a highly favorable safety record and delivered effective, long-lasting results over a two-year follow-up period.

== Awards and honors ==
- 2002 – Berthold Leibinger Innovation Prize, Berthold Leibinger Stiftung
- 2013 – Doctor Honoris Causa, Semmelweis University
- 2016 – External Member, Hungarian Academy of Sciences
- 2022 – Golden Goose Award, American Association for the Advancement of Science and Association of American Universities
- 2022 – Entrepreneurial Leader of the Year, University of California, Irvine

== Selected articles ==
- Juhasz, Tibor; Kastis, George A.; Suárez, Carlos; Bor, Zsolt; Bron, Walter E. (1996). "Time-resolved observations of shock waves and cavitation bubbles generated by femtosecond laser pulses in corneal tissue and water". Lasers in Surgery and Medicine. 19 (1): 23–31. doi:10.1002/(SICI)1096-9101(1996)19:1<23::AID-LSM4>3.0.CO;2-S. PMID 8836993. S2CID 23193533.
- Juhasz, T.; Loesel, F.H.; Kurtz, R.M.; Horvath, C.; Bille, J.F.; Mourou, G. (1999). "Corneal refractive surgery with femtosecond lasers". IEEE Journal of Selected Topics in Quantum Electronics. 5 (4): 902–910. Bibcode:1999IJSTQ...5..902J. doi:10.1109/2944.796309.
- Ratkay-Traub, Imola; Ferincz, Istvan E; Juhasz, Tibor; Kurtz, Ron M; Krueger, Ronald R (March 2003). "First Clinical Results With the Femtosecond Neodynium-glass Laser in Refractive Surgery". Journal of Refractive Surgery. 19 (2): 94–99. doi:10.3928/1081-597X-20030301-03. PMID 12701713.
- Nordan, Lee T; Slade, Stephen G; Baker, Richard N; Suarez, Carlos; Juhasz, Tibor; Kurtz, Ron (January 2003). "Femtosecond Laser Flap Creation for Laser in situ Keratomileusis: Six-month Follow-up of Initial U.S. Clinical Series". Journal of Refractive Surgery. 19 (1): 8–9. doi:10.3928/1081-597X-20030101-03. PMID 12553599.
- Mikula, Eric R.; Raksi, Ferenc; Ahmed, Iqbal Ike; Sharma, Manu; Holland, Guy; Khazaeinezhad, Reza; Bradford, Samantha; Jester, James V.; Juhasz, Tibor (25 March 2022). "Femtosecond Laser Trabeculotomy in Perfused Human Cadaver Anterior Segments: A Novel, Noninvasive Approach to Glaucoma Treatment". Translational Vision Science & Technology. 11 (3): 28. doi:10.1167/tvst.11.3.28. PMC 8963660. PMID 35333286.
- Nagy, Zoltan Z.; Kranitz, Kinga; Ahmed, Iqbal Ike K.; De Francesco, Ticiana; Mikula, Eric; Juhasz, Tibor (December 2023). "First-in-Human Safety Study of Femtosecond Laser Image-Guided Trabeculotomy for Glaucoma Treatment". Ophthalmology Science. 3 (4) 100313. doi:10.1016/j.xops.2023.100313. PMC 10285639. PMID 37363134.
- Luo, Shangbang; Mikula, Eric; Khazaeinezhad, Reza; Bradford, Samantha; Zhang, Fengyi; Jester, James; Juhasz, Tibor (April 2024). "Evaluating the effect of pulse energy on femtosecond laser trabeculotomy (FLT) outflow channels for glaucoma treatment in human cadaver eyes". Lasers in Surgery and Medicine. 56 (4): 382–391. doi:10.1002/lsm.23783. PMC 11361556. PMID 38570914.
