= Ernst Witebsky =

German-American immunologist

Ernest Witebsky, also Ernst Witebsky (3 September 1901 in Frankfurt am Main – 7 December 1969) was a German-American immunologist.

== Early life and education ==
Ernest Witebsky was born in Frankfurt am Main. From 1920 to 1926 Witebsky studied medicine at the University of Frankfurt and the University of Heidelberg.

== Career ==
After graduating from medical school in 1925 he worked with Hans Sachs at Heidelberg primarily on brain and organ tissue, as well as blood group antigens.

In 1933, he left Germany for Switzerland as a result of Nazi pressure, and in 1935 joined the Medical School of the University at Buffalo. In the 1950s he had begun studying antigens specific to a single organ, in the case of the thyroid gland, the antigen was thyroglobulin. He was a mentor to Noel Rose in this research endeavor to prepare thyroglobulin from rabbits. In 1967 the State University of New York created The Center for Immunology in Buffalo and appointed him as its first director.

== Achievements ==
Witebsky helped develop procedures for the isolation and partial characterization of A and B blood antigens. He also began the practice of neutralization of certain antibodies in the blood of universal blood donors.

In 1957, he co-authored a paper the "Witebsky's postulates" which determined whether a disease entity could be regarded as an autoimmune disease:

- Direct demonstration of free circulating antibodies active at body temperature.
- Recognition of the specific antigen (for this antibody).
- Production of antibodies against same antigen in experimental animals.
- Experimental animal demonstrates same tissue changes in human.

In 1993, the Postulates were revised based on direct evidence from transfer of pathogenic antibody or pathogenic T-cells, indirect evidence based on reproduction of the autoimmune disease in experimental animals and circumstantial evidence from clinical clues.:

- Auto-antibodies detectable in all cases of disease.
- Experimentally reproducible by immunization with antigen.
- Experimental disease must show immunopathological lesions that parallel those in the natural disease.
- Transferable by serum or lymphoid cells.

In 1959 Witebsky received the Karl Landsteiner Award for his work with blood antibodies.

In 2019, Witebsky was posthumously honored alongside his mentee, Noel Rose, with a Golden Goose Award for their work on autoimmune disease.
