= Golden Goose Award =

American prize for basic research

The Golden Goose Award is a United States award in recognition of scientists whose federally funded basic research has led to innovations or inventions with significant impact on humanity or society. Created by Congressman Jim Cooper of Tennessee in 2012, recipients receive the award in a ceremony during the fall each year on Capitol Hill in Washington D.C.

== Background ==
Between 1975 and 1988, William Proxmire, a Democratic United States Senator for Wisconsin awarded the tongue-in-cheek Golden Fleece Awards to public officials for spending public money in ways he considered irresponsible or wasteful. These awards were often given to scientists working on seemingly obscure federally funded scientific studies causing ridicule and scrutiny of the usefulness of such research.

The Golden Goose Awards were established over two decades later in order to highlight the value of federally-funded basic research. With the Golden Goose Award, Cooper wanted to reverse the image created by Proxmire's award by highlighting examples of seemingly obscure studies that have led to major breakthroughs and resulted in significant societal impact. The award has bipartisan support in Congress, sponsored by multiple organizations and legislators.

== Awardees ==
Year	Award Title	Project	Awardees
2012	Coralline Ceramics	Bone Grafts from Coral	Jon Weber, Eugene White, Rodney White, Della Roy
2012	Green Fluorescent Protein	Medical Advances from Jellyfish	Osamu Shimomura, Martin Chalfie, Roger Tsien
2012	The Maser	The Maser	Charles Townes
2013	Diabetes Medication	Diabetes Medication Developed from Gila Monster Venom	John Eng
2013	Thermus aquaticus	Thermus aquaticus	Thomas D. Brock, Hudson Freeze
2013	Market Design	Market Design	Alvin E. Roth, David Gale, Lloyd Shapley
2014	Black Holes and Supercomputing	Black Holes and Supercomputing	Larry Smarr
2014	Auction Design	Auction Design	Preston McAfee, Paul Milgrom, Robert Wilson
2014	Rat and Infant Massage	Rat Massage Research Helps Premature Babies Thrive	Tiffany Field, Gary Evoniuk, Cynthia Kuhn, Saul Schanberg
2015	Trick or Treat: The Marshmallow Test	The Marshmallow Test	Walter Mischel, Yuichi Shoda, Philip Peake
2015	Out of Sight: Neuroplasticity and Vision	Ocular Dominance Columns	Torsten Wiesel, David Hubel
2015	Of Maps and Men	Hypsographic Demography	Joel E. Cohen, Christopher Small
2016	A Tale of Two Studies: The Adolescent Health Story	The National Longitudinal Study of Adolescent to Adult Health	Peter Bearman, Barbara Entwisle, Kathleen Mullan Harris, Ronald Rindfuss, Richard Udry
2016	The Sex Life of the Screw Worm Fly	The Sex Life of the Screw Worm Fly	Edward F. Knipling, Raymond C. Bushland
2016	The Honey Bee Algorithm	The Honey Bee Algorithm	John J. Bartholdi III, Sunil Nakrani, Thomas Dyer Seeley, Craig A. Tovey, John Hagood Vande Vate
2017	The Sea Soy Solution	The Sea Soy Solution	Kaichang Li
2017	The Silence of the Frogs	The Silence of the Frogs	Joyce Longcore, Elaine Lamirande, Don Nichols, Allan Pessier
2017	Fuzzy Logic, Clear Impact	Fuzzy Logic, Clear Impact	Lotfi A. Zadeh
2018	The Goose Gland: Discoveries in Immunology	The Goose Gland: Discoveries in Immunology	Bruce Glick
2018	Chickens, Cells and Cytokines	Chickens, Cells and Cytokines	Stanley Cohen
2018	Implicit Bias, Explicit Science	Implicit Bias, Explicit Science	Mahzarin Banaji, Anthony Greenwald, Brian Nosek
2019	The Blood of the Horseshoe Crab	The Blood of the Horseshoe Crab	Jack Levin, Frederik Bang
2019	Advancing Autoimmunity	Advancing Autoimmunity	Noel Rose, Ernest Witebsky
2019	The Frog Skin that saved 50 Million Lives	The Frog Skin that saved 50 Million Lives	David B. Sachar
2020	A Llama Named Winter	A Llama Named Winter	Jason McLellan, Daniel Wrapp
2020	The Human Immunome: Small Moves Become a Movement	The Human Immunome: Small Moves Become a Movement	James E. Crowe
2020	A Spike in Momentum	A Spike in Momentum	Kizzmekia Corbett, Barney Graham, Emmie de Wit, and Vincent Munster
2021	Making MRNA	mRNA therapeutics	Katalin Karikó, Drew Weissman
2021	The Fast and the Curious	How the critical functions of internet-connected vehicles can be compromised by remote attackers	Stephen Checkoway, Tadayoshi Kohno, Karl Koscher, Stefan Savage
2021	The Secrets of SERMs	Research on drugs for breast cancer treatment, in particular tamoxifen	V. Craig Jordan
2022	Foldscopes and Frugal Science: Paper Microscopes Make Science Globally Accessible	Foldscope for accessible and powerful science education	Manu Prakash and Jim Cybulski
2022	Tiny Snail, Big Impact: Cone Snail Venom Eases Pain and Injects New Energy into Neuroscience		Craig T. Clark, Lourdes J. Cruz, J. Michael McIntosh, and Baldomero Marquez Olivera
2022	How a Lab Incident Led to Better Eye Surgery for Millions of People		Tibor Juhasz, Ron Kurtz, Detao Du, Gérard Mourou, and Donna Strickland
2023	Sketch to Concept: Unraveling the Invention of Nanopore Sequencing		David Deamer, Mark Akeson, and Daniel Branton
2023	Agrobacterium: Nature’s Genetic Engineer, Hidden Within Plant Tumors		Mary-Dell Chilton
2023	Raising Chickens, Elevating Scientists		Paul Siegel
2024	It’s a Family Affair: The Resurgence of the Red-Cockaded Woodpecker		Jeff Walters
2024	From Poop to Protection: Satellite Discoveries Help Save Antarctic Penguins and Advance Wildlife Monitoring		Christian Che-Castaldo, Heather Joan Lynch, Mathew Schwaller
2024	How We Think: Brain-Inspired Models of Human Cognition Contribute to the Foundations of Today’s Artificial Intelligence		Geoffrey Hinton, James L. McClelland, David E. Rumelhart
2025	Nature’s Oddities Inform Disease Diagnostics and Inspire Prize-Winning Scientists		Joseph G. Gall
2025	Cisplatin Breakthrough Redefines Testicular Cancer Treatment		Barnett Rosenberg, Loretta VanCamp, Thomas Krigas

== Founding organizations ==
Some of the twelve founding organizations for this award are the American Association for the Advancement of Science (AAAS), the Association of American Universities (AAU), the Association of Public and Land-grant Universities (A۰P۰L۰U), the Breakthrough Institute, the Progressive Policy Institute (PPI), and The Science Coalition (TSC)
