= Marzi =

Marzi may refer to:

== People ==
- Andrea Marzi, German-American virologist
- Franca Marzi (1926–1989), Italian film actress
- Giulio Marzi (1647–1718), Roman Catholic prelate
- Gustavo Marzi (1908–1966), Italian fencer
- Mario Marzi (born 1964), Italian saxophonist
- Marzi Pestonji (born 1979), Indian dancer and choreographer

== Places ==
- Marzi, Calabria, town in the province of Cosenza in southern Italy

== Other ==
- Marzi (serial), Pakistani drama serial that first aired on Geo Tv on 14 July 2016
- Marzi (web series), Indian Web Series streaming on OTT platform Voot
- Marzi: A Memoir, a French graphic novel series
