= Hendrik Streeck =

German virologist

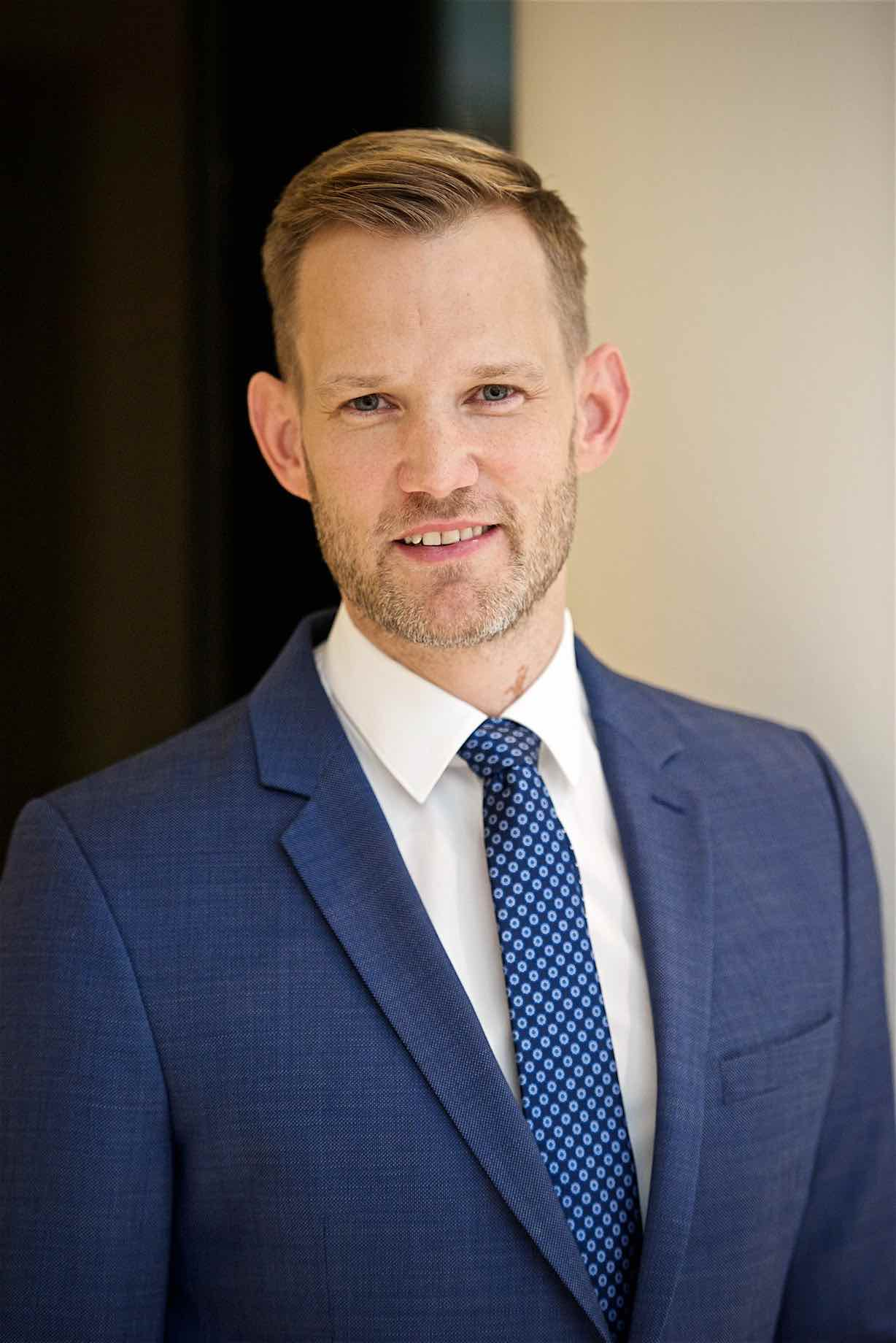
- Streeck in 2019
- Born: 7 August 1977 (age 48); Göttingen, West Germany (now Germany)
- Occupations: Scientist, physician, clinical trialist
- Organization: Institute for HIV Research
- Relatives: Hans Streeck (grandfather)

Hendrik Streeck (born 7 August 1977 in Göttingen) is a German researcher of human immunodeficiency virus, epidemiologist and clinical trialist. He is professor of virology and the director of the Institute of Virology and HIV Research at the University Bonn.

== Early life and education ==
Streeck studied medicine at the Charite University, Berlin. After his graduation he started to work as a postdoctoral fellow at the Ragon Institute of Massachusetts General Hospital, the Massachusetts Institute of Technology, and Harvard Medical School and obtained his PhD from the University of Bonn, and part-time at the Partners AIDS Research Center, Massachusetts General Hospital and Harvard Medical School.

== Career ==
In 2009 Streeck was promoted to Instructor in Medicine and in 2011 to Assistant Professor at Harvard Medical School. In September 2012 he was recruited to the United States Military HIV Research Program, Bethesda, where he became the Chief of the Cellular Immunology Section as well as assistant professor at the Uniformed Services University of Health Sciences and adjunct faculty of the Bloomberg School of Public Health, Johns Hopkins University. In 2015 he became the chair for Medical Biology at the University Duisburg-Essen and founded the Institute for HIV Research in the same year, though he still maintains the status of "visiting scientist" with the US Military HIV Research Program.

In 2018, Streeck was appointed to the advisory board of the German AIDS Foundation (Deutsche AIDS Stiftung). In April 2020, he was appointed by Minister-President Armin Laschet of North Rhine-Westphalia to a 12-member expert group to advise on economic and social consequences of the COVID-19 pandemic in Germany.

=== HIV research ===
Under Streek's direction the Institute for HIV Research works on several prevention methods against HIV including the development and feasibility of HIV vaccines as well as pre-exposure prophylaxis. A particular focus for HIV vaccine development is to understand how T follicular helper (Tfh) cells can drive protective antibody responses during the germinal center reaction. Further research areas of the institute include understanding why some co-morbidities, such as cancer or cardiovascular diseases, are more prone to develop in chronic HIV infection and whether strategies can be developed to suppress HIV viral loads in the absence of antiretroviral therapy. Some of these studies are being performed in Maputo, Mozambique, where he leads a PhD sandwich program with the Instituto Nacionale de Saude to train and retain young physician scientists.

=== Sexually transmitted infections research ===
Streeck actively investigates the epidemiology, novel prevention and treatment options of other sexually transmitted infections. Currently, he conducts the largest systematic study for sexually transmitted infections in Germany, which seeks to understand who is becoming infected with which sexually transmitted infection.

In January 2019 the study was expanded to other European countries including France, Italy, Spain, Poland and Hungary under the name STIPnet study. In parallel, a European network to prevent human immunodeficiency virus and sexually transmitted infections will be established. He has been nominated as the co-chair of International AIDS conference IAS 2021 in Berlin.

=== COVID-19 research ===
In early April 2020, Streeck and his team reported with reference to their COVID-19 Case-Cluster-Study that they had carried out an intensive search of the home of a family infected with COVID-19 but found no trace of it on surfaces.

Streeck is accused by parts of the German media landscape of having presumably contributed to the poor course of the pandemic in Germany from October 2020 onwards through several misleading and false claims and conclusions that quickly gained traction in the German public.

== Political career ==
In 2023, Streeck announced his intention to run as candidate for the center-right Christian Democratic Union (CDU) in the 2025 national elections. In the election he was elected as the direct candidate in Bonn with 33.3% of the first vote.

In the negotiations to form a Grand Coalition under the leadership of Friedrich Merz's Christian Democrats (CDU together with the Bavarian CSU) and the SPD following the 2025 German elections, Streeck was part of the CDU/CSU delegation in the working group on health, led by Karl-Josef Laumann, Stephan Pilsinger and Katja Pähle.

In addition to his work in parliament, Streeck has been serving as Commissioner on Narcotic Drugs at the Federal Ministry of Health in the government of Chancellor Friedrich Merz since 2025.

== Other activities ==
- German Medical Association, Member
- German Society for Virology (GfV), Member
- Rotary International, Member

== Personal life ==
Streeck lives with his husband Paul Zubeil in Bonn. Zubeil has been employed as a sub-department head for European and international affairs at the Federal Ministry of Health in Bonn since February 2021.

Streeck's grandfather, Hans Streeck, was an Schutzstaffel (SS) officer. He joined the Sturmabteilung in 1933, the SS in 1935 and the Nazi Party in 1937. In the spring of 1942, he was commissioned by Otto Ambros to participate in the planning and construction of the IG Farben plant at the Auschwitz concentration camp. The construction work was carried out by forced laborers. In the autumn, the Auschwitz III concentration camp was established specifically for the plant. Ambros testified that Streeck lost his large and responsible position on January 21, 1945 (after the death marches) so that he could not reap the rewards of his diligence and his many hours of work at this site.

== Awards ==
- 2015 – 15 HIV Advocates to Watch in 2015
- 2014 – People Magazine “Sexiest Scientist” 2014
- 2011 – Young Investigator Award, Collaborative AIDS Vaccine Discovery Bill and Melinda Gates Foundation
- 2010 – Young Investigator Award, 17th CROI, San Francisco, CA
- 2009 – Biennial German AIDS Award
- 2009 – New Investigator Award, AIDS Vaccine Conference, Paris
- 2009 – New Investigator Award, 16th CROI, Montreal, Canada
- 2008 – Young Investigator Award, World AIDS Conference, Mexico City
- 2008 – New Investigator Award, AIDS Vaccine Conference, Cape Town
- 2008 – NIH Scholarship 2008, HIV-Vaccine, Keystone, Banff
- 2008 – Young Investigator Award, 15th CROI, Boston, MA
- 2007 – Young Investigator Award, 14th CROI, Los Angeles, CA
- 2006 – Young Investigator Award, 13th CROI, Denver, CO
- 2006 – Young Investigator Award, World AIDS Conference, Toronto
- 2005 – Young Investigator Award, HIV-Pathogenesis, Keystone, Banff

== Associations ==
- American Society for Microbiology
- American Association of Immunologists
- German Association of University Professors (Deutscher Hochschulverband)
- Rotary International

== Works ==
=== Books/Chapters ===
- H. Streeck, G. Alter: "Immune Responses to Viral Infections." In: D. D. Richman, J. Whitley, F. G. Hayden: Clinical virology. 4. edition. ASM Press, 2016, ISBN 978-1-55581-942-2
- H. Streeck: Bug Attack (The Adventures of Damien the CD4 Cell & his Friends).Band 1, ISBN 1-5052-4534-6. (A children's book for age 3–6 years, English)

=== Publications (selection) ===
- B. T. Schultz, A. F. Oster, F. Pissani, J. E. Teigler, G. Kranias, G. Alter, M. Marovich, M. A. Eller, U. Dittmer, M. L. Robb, J. H. Kim, N. L. Michael, D. Bolton, H. Streeck: "Circulating HIV-Specific Interleukin-21+CD4+ T Cells Represent Peripheral Tfh Cells with Antigen-Dependent Helper Functions." In: Immunity. 2016.
- F. Pissani, H. Streeck: "Emerging concepts on T follicular helper cell dynamics in HIV infection" In: Trends in Immunology. 35(6), Jun 2014, S. 278–286.
- S. Ranasinghe, S. Cutler, I. Davis, R. Lu, D. Z. Soghoian, Y. Qi, J. Sidney, G. Kranias, M. D. Flanders, M. Lindqvist, B. Kuhl, G. Alter, S. G. Deeks, B. D. Walker, X. Gao, A. Sette, M. Carrington, H. Streeck: "Association of HLA-DRB1-restricted CD4^{+}T cell responses with HIV immune control." In: Nature Medicine . 19(7), Jul 2013, S. 930–933.
- M. Lindqvist, J. van Lunzen, D. Z. Soghoian, B. D. Kuhl, S. Ranasinghe, G. Kranias, M. D. Flanders, S. Cutler, N. Yudanin, M. I. Muller, I. Davis, D. Farber, P. Hartjen, F. Haag, G. Alter, J. Schulze zur Wiesch, H. Streeck: "Expansion of HIV-specific T follicular helper cells in chronic HIV infection" In: Journal of Clinical Investigation. 122(9), 4. Sep 2012, S. 3271–3280.
- M. F. Chevalier, B. Jülg, A. Pyo, M. Flanders, S. Ranasinghe, D. Z. Soghoian, D. S. Kwon, J. Rychert, J. Lian, M. I. Muller, S. Cutler, E. McAndrew, H. Jessen, F. Pereyra, E. S. Rosenberg, M. Altfeld, B. D. Walker, H. Streeck: "HIV-1-specific interleukin-21+ CD4+ T cell responses contribute to durable viral control through the modulation of HIV-specific CD8+ T cell function." In: Journal of Virology. 85(2), Jan 2011, S. 733–741.
- H. Streeck, B. Li, A. F. Poon, A. Schneidewind, A. D. Gladden, K. A. Power, D. Daskalakis, S. Bazner, R. Zuniga, C. Brander, E. S. Rosenberg, S. D. Frost, M. Altfeld, T. M. Allen: "Immune-driven recombination and loss of control after HIV superinfection" In: Journal of Experimental Medicine. 205(8), 4. Aug 2008, S. 1789–1796.
