= Kizzmekia Corbett-Helaire =

American immunologist

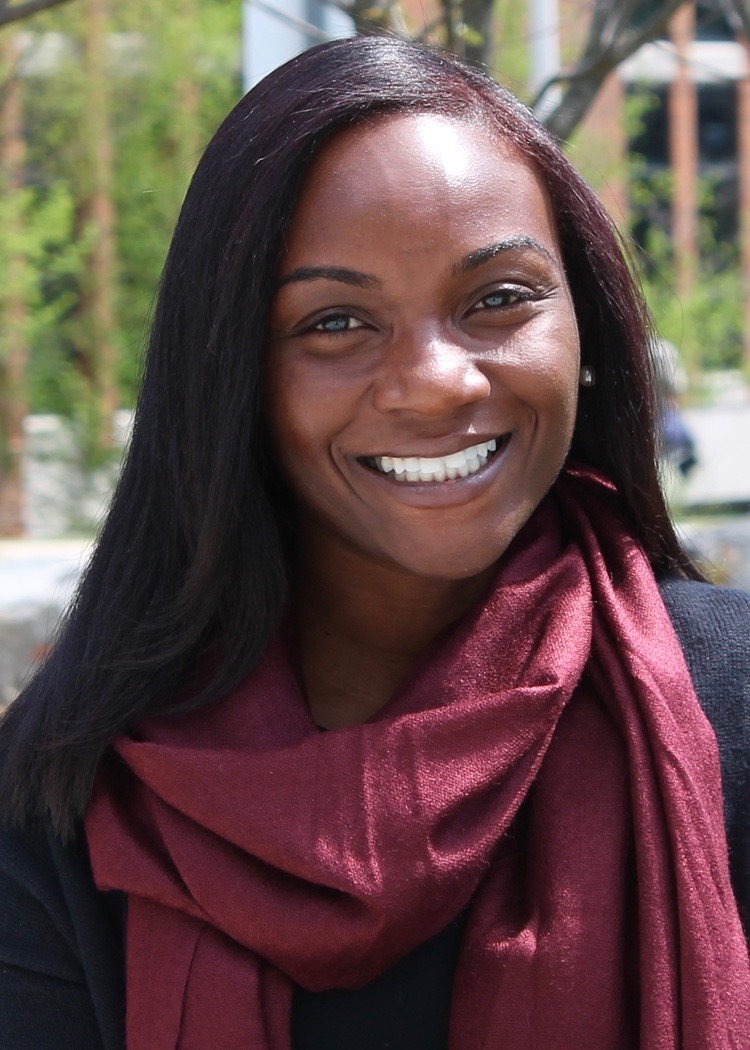
- Born: Kizzmekia Shanta Corbett; January 26, 1986 (age 40); Hurdle Mills, North Carolina, U.S.
- Education: University of Maryland, Baltimore County (BS); University of North Carolina, Chapel Hill (MS, PhD)
- Occupation: Immunologist
- Known for: COVID-19 vaccine
- Scientific career
- Fields: Immunology; Microbiology
- Workplaces: Harvard T.H. Chan School of Public Health; Harvard Radcliffe Institute; National Institute of Allergy and Infectious Diseases
- Thesis: "Characterization of Human Antibody Responses to Dengue Virus Infections in a Sri Lankan Pediatric Cohort" (2014)

Kizzmekia "Kizzy" Shanta Corbett-Helaire (née Corbett, born January 26, 1986) is an American viral immunologist. She is an assistant professor of immunology and infectious diseases at Harvard T.H. Chan School of Public Health and the Shutzer Assistant Professor at the Harvard Radcliffe Institute since June 2021, and was named a Howard Hughes Medical Institute Freeman Hrabowski Scholar in 2023.

She joined Harvard following six years at the Vaccine Research Center (VRC) at the National Institute of Allergy and Infectious Diseases, National Institutes of Health (NIAID NIH) based in Bethesda, Maryland. She earned a PhD in microbiology and immunology from the University of North Carolina at Chapel Hill (UNC-Chapel Hill) in 2014.

Appointed to the VRC in 2014, Corbett-Helaire was a postdoctoral scientist of the VRC's COVID-19 Team, with. research efforts aimed at COVID-19 vaccines. In February 2021, Corbett-Helaire was highlighted in Time's "Time100 Next" list under the category of Innovators, with a profile written by Anthony Fauci.

== Early life and education ==
Corbett-Helaire was born in Hurdle Mills, North Carolina on January 26, 1986, to Rhonda Brooks. She grew up in Hillsborough, North Carolina, where she had a large family of step-siblings and foster siblings. She is a member of Alpha Kappa Alpha Sorority Incorporated.

Corbett-Helaire went to Oak Lane Elementary School in Roxboro and A.L. Stanback Middle School in Hillsborough. Her fourth grade teacher, Myrtis Bradsher, recalls recognizing Corbett-Helaire's talent at an early age and encouraging Kizzy's mother to place her in advanced classes. "I always thought she is going to do something one day. She dotted i's and crossed t's. The best in my 30 years of teaching," Bradsher said in a 2020 interview with The Washington Post.

In 2004, Corbett-Helaire graduated from Orange High School in Hillsborough, North Carolina. In 2008, Corbett-Helaire received a B.S. in biological sciences and sociology from the University of Maryland, Baltimore County (UMBC), as a student in the Meyerhoff Scholars Program. Corbett-Helaire is among a cohort of recent UMBC graduates (including Kaitlyn Sadtler) who have risen to prominence in biomedicine during the COVID-19 pandemic. In 2014, Corbett-Helaire received a PhD in microbiology and immunology from the University of North Carolina at Chapel Hill. For her doctoral work, Corbett-Helaire worked in Sri Lanka to study the role of human antibodies in dengue virus pathogenesis.

== Career ==
While in high school, Corbett-Helaire realized that she wanted to pursue a scientific career, and as part of an American Chemical Society-sponsored program called Project SEED, spent her summer holiday working in research laboratories, one of which was at UNC's Kenan Labs with organic chemist James Morkin. In 2005, she was a summer intern at Stony Brook University in Gloria Viboud's lab where she studied Yersinia pseudotuberculosis pathogenesis. From 2006 to 2007, she worked as a lab tech in Susan Dorsey's lab at the University of Maryland School of Nursing.

After earning her bachelor's degree, from 2006 to 2009, Corbett-Helaire was a biological sciences trainer at the National Institutes of Health (NIH), where she worked alongside Barney S. Graham. At the NIH, Corbett-Helaire worked on the pathogenesis of respiratory syncytial virus as well as on a project focused on innovative vaccine platform advancement.

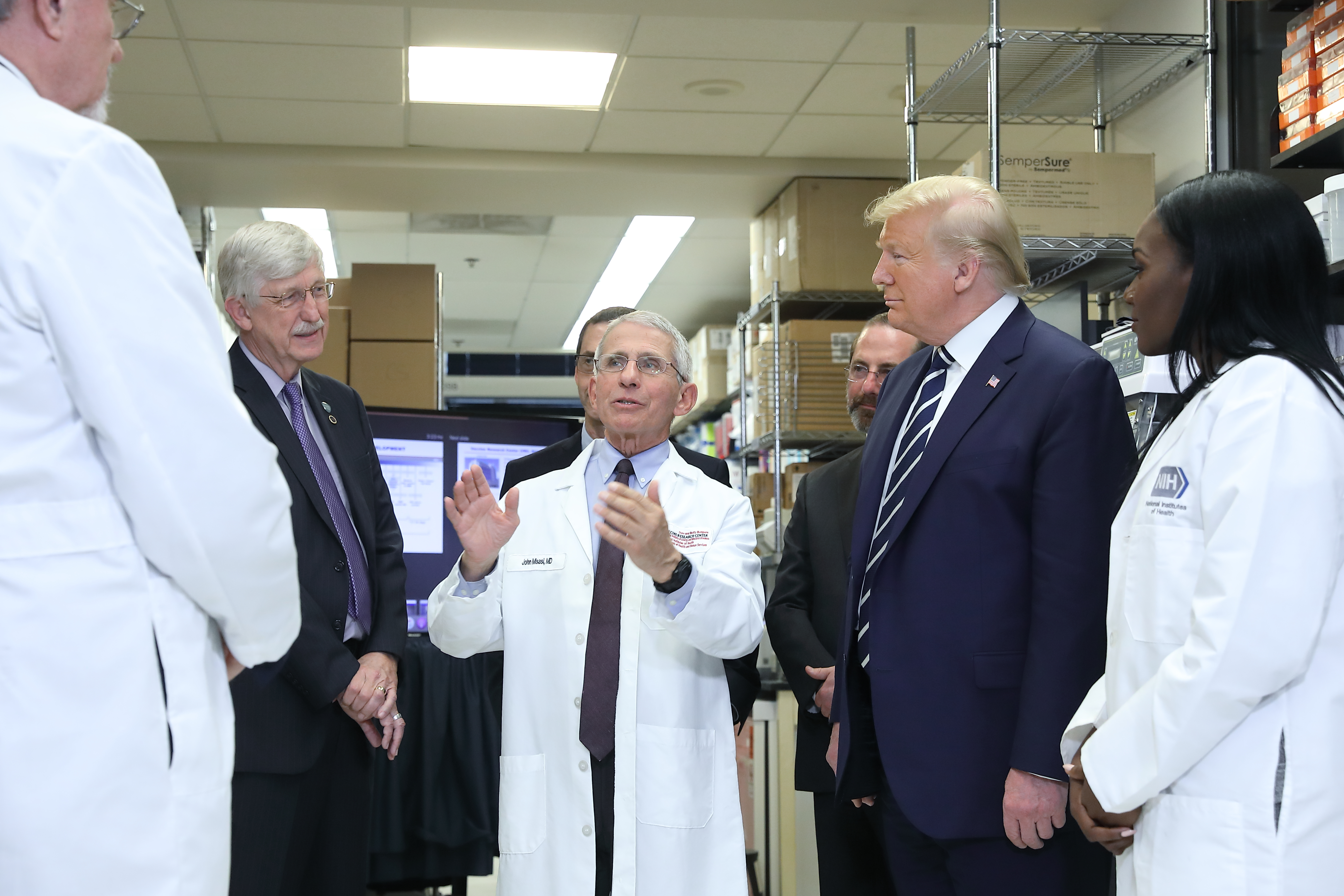
Dr. Kizzmekia Corbett-Helaire (far right) with President Donald Trump, Dr. Anthony Fauci, and Dr. Francis Collins during Trump's visit to the NIH Vaccine Research Center on March 3, 2020.

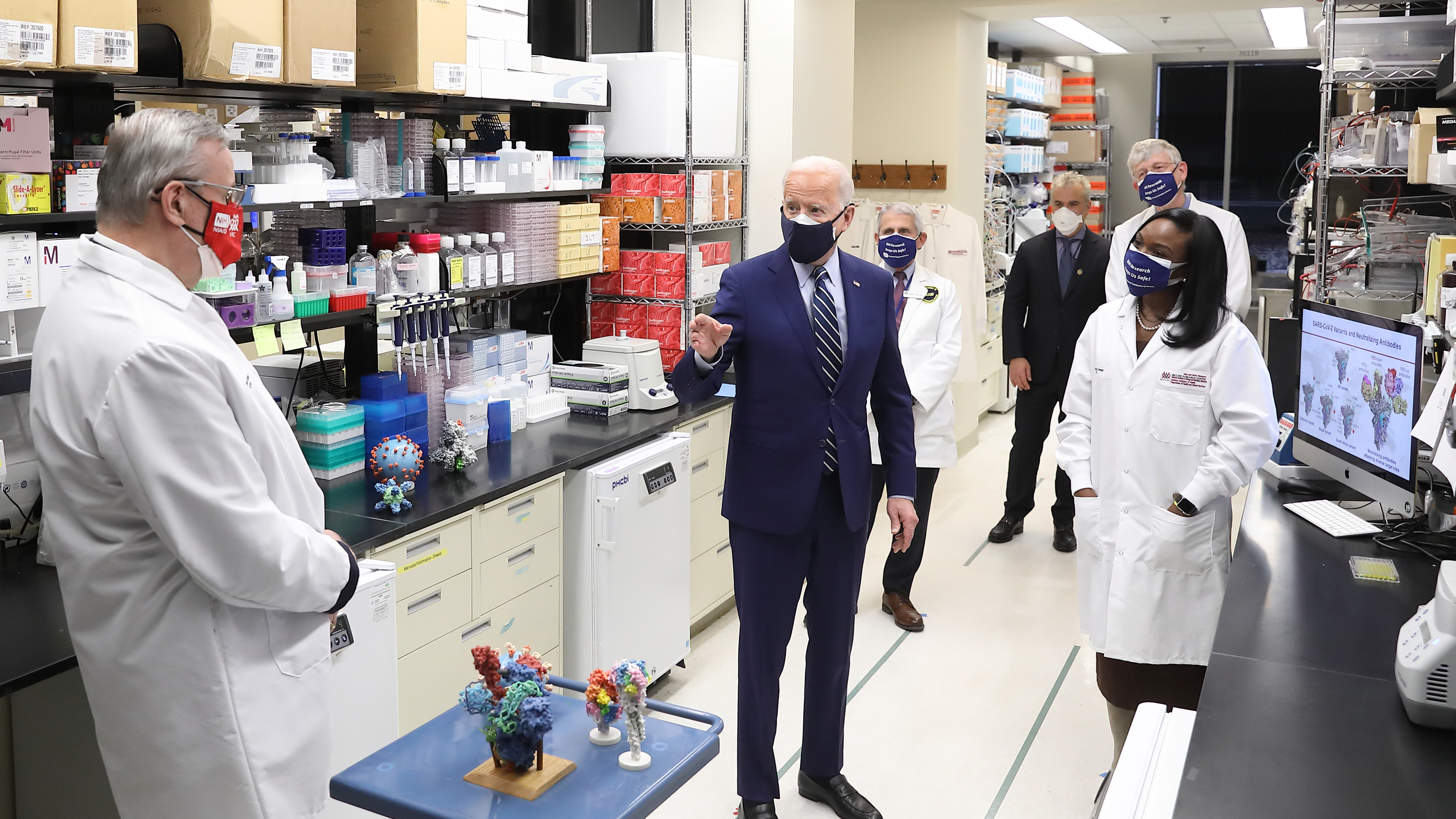
Dr. Kizzmekia Corbett-Helaire (far right) with President Joe Biden, Dr. Anthony Fauci, and Dr. Francis Collins during Biden's visit to the NIH Vaccine Research Center on February 11, 2021.

From 2009 to 2014, Corbett-Helaire studied human antibody responses to dengue virus in Sri Lankan children under the supervision of Aravinda de Silva at University of North Carolina at Chapel Hill (UNC-Chapel Hill). She studied how people produce antibodies in response to dengue fever, and how the genetics of dengue fever impact the severity of a disease. From April to May 2014, as part of her research for her dissertation, Corbett-Helaire worked as a visiting scholar at Genetech Research Institute in Colombo, Sri Lanka.

In October 2014, Corbett-Helaire became a research fellow working as a viral immunologist at the NIH under Barney S. Graham. Her research aimed to uncover mechanisms of viral pathogenesis and host immunity. She specifically focuses on development of novel vaccines for coronaviridae. Her early research considered the development of Severe Acute Respiratory Syndrome (SARS) and Middle East Respiratory Syndrome (MERS) vaccine antigens. During this time, she identified a simple way to make coronavirus spike proteins that are stabilized in a conformation that renders them more immunogenic and manufacturable, in collaboration with researchers at Scripps Research Institute and Dartmouth College. She developed methods for rapidly producing antigen proteins that could be modified to match different viruses, as well as methods for delivering the genetic instructions for these proteins to cells via messenger RNA—work that would prove directly applicable to COVID-19.

Prior to the COVID-19 pandemic, Corbett-Helaire's laboratory work on Middle East Respiratory Syndrome (MERS) coronavirus yielded a structural insight that would later prove critical to multiple COVID-19 vaccines. In 2017, she and colleagues published work in the Proceedings of the National Academy of Sciences describing a method of stabilizing coronavirus spike proteins in their prefusion conformation using two proline (2P) amino acid substitutions. These "2P" mutations, which prevent the spike protein from collapsing before it can trigger an immune response, were subsequently incorporated into the sequence of mRNA-1273 and other COVID-19 vaccines including Pfizer-BioNTech's BNT162b2. This prefusion stabilization technology is the subject of U.S. patent 10,960,070, granted in March 2021, on which Corbett-Helaire is a named inventor.

During this same period, she contributed to influenza vaccine research, co-authoring work on nanoparticle-displayed hemagglutinin stem antigens designed to elicit broadly neutralizing antibody responses across influenza strains, as part of a broader effort toward a universal influenza vaccine.

=== Development of COVID-19 vaccine ===
At the onset of the COVID-19 pandemic, Corbett-Helaire started working on a vaccine to protect people from coronavirus disease. Recognizing that the virus was similar to severe acute respiratory syndrome coronavirus, Corbett's team utilized previous knowledge of optimal coronavirus proteins to tackle COVID-19. S proteins form a "crown" on the surface of coronaviruses and are crucial for engagement of host cell receptors and the initiation of membrane fusion in coronavirus disease. This makes them a particularly vulnerable target for coronavirus prophylactics and therapeutics. Based on her previous research, Corbett-Helaire's team, in collaboration with Jason McLellan and other investigators at The University of Texas at Austin, transplanted stabilizing mutations from SARS-CoV S protein into SARS-CoV-2 spike protein. She was part of the NIH team who helped solve the cryogenic electron microscopy (CryoEM) structure of the SARS-CoV-2 spike protein. Her prior research suggested that messenger RNA (mRNA) encoding S protein could be used to excite the immune response to produce protective antibodies against coronavirus disease 2019.

To manufacture and test the COVID-19 vaccine Corbett-Helaire's team partnered with Moderna, a biotechnology company, to rapidly enter animal studies. Subsequently, the vaccine entered Phase 1 clinical trial only 66 days after the virus sequence was released. The trial, to be completed in at least 45 people, is a dose escalation study in the form of two injections separated by 28 days. In December 2020, the Institute's Director, Anthony Fauci said: "Kizzy is an African American scientist who is right at the forefront of the development of the vaccine." In Time Magazine's profile, Fauci wrote that Corbett-Helaire has "been central to the development of the Moderna mRNA vaccine and the Eli Lilly therapeutic monoclonal antibody that were first to enter clinical trials in the U.S." and that "her work will have a substantial impact on ending the worst respiratory-disease pandemic in more than 100 years." Corbett-Helaire's work afforded her the opportunity to be a part of the National Institutes of Health team that had Donald Trump at the Dale and Betty Bumpers Vaccine Research Center in March 2020. When asked about her involvement with the development of the COVID-19 vaccine, Corbett said, "To be living in this moment where I have the opportunity to work on something that has imminent global importance...it's just a surreal moment for me". Corbett stated she cried when the efficacy results showed the mRNA-1273 Moderna vaccine worked.

=== Eli Lilly therapeutic antibody work ===
Alongside her mRNA vaccine research, Corbett-Helaire contributed to the development of two therapeutic monoclonal antibodies that became authorized COVID-19 treatments in collaboration with Eli Lilly and Company and AbCellera.

The first, bamlanivimab (LY-CoV555), was identified from a blood sample taken from one of the first U.S. patients to recover from COVID-19. Scientists at the NIH Vaccine Research Center, including Corbett-Helaire, tested the antibody on behalf of the Lilly–AbCellera partnership. Bamlanivimab became the first anti-SARS-CoV-2 monoclonal antibody to enter clinical trials, doing so in June 2020—only three months after discovery efforts began.

The second antibody, bebtelovimab (LY-CoV1404), was co-developed to address the limitation that many earlier therapeutic antibodies lost effectiveness against SARS-CoV-2 variants of concern. Corbett-Helaire is listed as a co-author on the paper characterizing bebtelovimab's activity. The antibody received U.S. Food and Drug Administration Emergency Use Authorization in February 2022 and was shown to retain potent neutralizing activity against the Omicron variant and its subvariants. Anthony Fauci specifically highlighted Corbett-Helaire's role in both the vaccine and the Eli Lilly therapeutic antibody work, writing that she had been "central to the development of the Moderna mRNA vaccine and the Eli Lilly therapeutic monoclonal antibody that were first to enter clinical trials in the U.S.

In December 2021, Corbett-Helaire was assigned to Boston's COVID-19 advisory committee by Mayor Michelle Wu.

=== Patents ===
Corbett-Helaire is a named inventor on multiple U.S. patents arising from her research at the NIH Vaccine Research Center. Her most foundational patent, co-invented with Barney S. Graham, Jason McLellan, Andrew Ward, and others, covers prefusion coronavirus spike proteins and their use in vaccines. U.S. Patent No. 10,960,070 B2 was granted on March 30, 2021, and is assigned to Dartmouth College, the Scripps Research Institute, and the U.S. Department of Health and Human Services. It covers coronavirus ectodomain trimers stabilized in their prefusion conformation—the core molecular technology underlying mRNA-1273 and multiple other authorized COVID-19 vaccines.

Beyond mRNA-1273, Corbett-Helaire's patent portfolio also includes universal coronavirus and influenza vaccine concepts and novel therapeutic antibodies.

=== Laboratory and ongoing research ===
In June 2021, Corbett-Helaire joined Harvard T.H. Chan School of Public Health as an assistant professor in the Department of Immunology and Infectious Diseases, holding the Melvin J. and Geraldine L. Glimcher endowed chair and the Shutzer Assistant Professorship at the Harvard Radcliffe Institute. She is also an Associate Member of the Ragon Institute. In 2023, she was selected as a Howard Hughes Medical Institute Freeman Hrabowski Scholar, an award recognizing outstanding early-career scientists from underrepresented backgrounds.

The Corbett Lab at Harvard focuses on pandemic preparedness through understanding how the immune system responds to coronavirus spike proteins. According to the HHMI, a central question driving the lab is how B cell and antibody responses can be directed toward epitopes shared across multiple coronavirus strains—cross-reactive responses that would form the basis of a universal coronavirus vaccine.The lab is also working to map the antigenic landscape of endemic coronaviruses—the strains that circulate continuously and cause common cold-like illness—which may inform broader protective immunity strategies.

=== Public statements related to COVID-19 ===
Corbett-Helaire called for the public to be cautious and respectful of one another during the COVID-19 pandemic, explaining that regular hand washing and sneezing into one's elbow can help to minimize the spread of the virus. She has also emphasized that we should not stigmatize people who may be from areas where the virus started.

Corbett-Helaire has worked to rebuild trust with vaccine-hesitant populations such as the Black community. For example, she presented education about the COVID-19 vaccine development to Black Health Matters in October 2020. Her race has been a focus of government outreach; after a study released by the NAACP and others revealed that only 14% of black Americans believe a COVID-19 vaccine will be safe, NIAID Director Fauci was explicit: "the first thing you might want to say to my African American brothers and sisters is that the vaccine that you're going to be taking was developed by an African American woman."

During August 2026 Corbett-Helaire discussed the potential of mRNA technology to improve influenza vaccines in an interview with GBH. She explained that mRNA can help the immune system recognize viral proteins, comparing the process to seeing a clear high definition picture. Her comments on it came after the US food and drug administration approved Moderna's mRNA flu vaccine, mFLUSIVA, for adults that are 50 and older.

Corbett-Helaire appeared on NPR's TED Radio Hour in August 2026 to discuss vaccine skepticism and public trust in science. She reflected on the challenges of explaining scientific advances to the public during the COVID-19 pandemic.

=== Controversial tweets ===
In May 2020, The Washington Post reported that Corbett-Helaire had been scrutinized for tweets lamenting the lack of diversity on the White House Coronavirus Task Force, as well as for her responses to other tweets about data that African Americans were disproportionately dying from the virus. Responding to a tweet in which someone else claimed that the virus "is a way to get rid of us", Corbett-Helaire responded: "Some have gone as far to call it genocide. I plead the fifth.". Fox News news host Tucker Carlson read several of Corbett-Helaire's tweets on his show, accusing her of "spouting lunatic conspiracy theories". Another Fox News article said she "adopts a strikingly casual and conspiratorial tone". After the controversy, Corbett scaled back her use of social media and stopped appearing on television. Texas Southern University professor Robert Bullard and president of the National Medical Association (an organization of Black physicians) Oliver Brooks defended Corbett-Helaire overall, although Brooks expressed concern about her tweet on genocide, saying "It's subjective. I wouldn't want to go there. I really don't believe that. We're dying at a higher rate but ... that one just doesn't fit.".

== Advocacy for Black people in science ==
Corbett-Helaire has criticized science's lack of connection with society, and Black people in particular:

"Why are we thinking about institutes within the brick walls ... when our science and our reach is supposed to go beyond that?" she asked, pointing out that Harvard's T.H. Chan School of Public Health sits in a Black neighborhood but has little connection to it. "There are so many things about how we have built silos and walls that absolutely and unfortunately do not benefit Black people."

She believes it is important to retain one's identity when working in science and in academia: "Keeping those cultural markers prominent—playing Jeezy in the lab, wearing braids to PhD interviews, as Corbett-Helaire recalled—is a way of showing that Black people and Black culture absolutely belong in academic spaces. 'We need to be ourselves and allow the institutions to shape around who we are'".

== Academic service ==
Corbett-Helaire shares information on Twitter and takes part in programs to inspire young people in underserved communities.

Corbett-Helaire uses social media to communicate scientific information to the public. In September 2024, she described using Instagram Reels to explain complex vaccine data.

== Honors ==
- UNC Frank Porter Graham Honor Society
- 2002–2004: American Chemical Society, Project SEED at UNC-Chapel Hill
- 2006: National Institute of Health, NIH Undergraduate Scholarship
- University of Maryland, Baltimore County, Meyerhoff Scholar
- 2013: Third Pan American Dengue Research Network Meeting Travel Award
- 2020: Co-recipient of the Golden Goose Award with Barney Graham, Emmie de Wit and Vincent Munster for excellence in federally funded research
- 2021: Highlighted by Time magazine in the 2021 "Time100 Next" list, under the category of Innovators
- In recognition of her work on the vaccine, Orange County, North Carolina named January 12, 2021 "Dr. Kizzy Corbett Day".
- 2021: Received the Dean's Medal from the Johns Hopkins Bloomberg School of Public Health, the school's highest recognition for public health leaders.
- 2021: Named Federal Employee of the Year by the Partnership for Public Service at the Samuel J. Heyman Service to America Medals ceremony, shared with Barney S. Graham, for their research that led to the development of COVID-19 vaccines in record time.
- 2021: Recipient of the North Carolina Award for Science, the state's highest civilian honor, presented by Governor Roy Cooper, in recognition of her contributions to COVID-19 vaccine development.
- 2021: Received the Clinton Global Citizen Award from the Clinton Global Initiative, recognizing her leadership and contribution to public health during the COVID-19 pandemic.
- 2021: Received the Benjamin Franklin NextGen Award from the Franklin Institute for her contributions to viral immunology research and the foundational design for the mRNA COVID-19 vaccine.
- 2022: National Honoree, USA TODAY's Women of the Year
- 2022: Received the Rising Star Award from the Sabin Vaccine Institute, in recognition of her contributions to vaccine development and her efforts to build public confidence in vaccines.
- 2022: AAAS Early Career Award for Public Engagement with Science
- 2022: Received Nature's Inspiring Women in Science Award.
- 2023: Co-recipient (with Anthony Fauci) of the 2022 J. William Fulbright Prize for International Understanding, awarded by the Fulbright Association in recognition of their leadership in combating the COVID-19 pandemic and contributions to global public health.
- 2023: Selected as a Freeman Hrabowski Scholar by the Howard Hughes Medical Institute.
- 2024: Received the Hans Sigrist Prize by the University of Bern
- 2025: Selected by the Pew Charitable Trusts for her early-career work in viral immunology and pandemic preparedness
- 2025: Recognized for advocacy in health research and infectious diseases with a Research!America Building the Foundation Advocacy Award
- 2026: Named a TED Fellow in the 2026 class of the TED Fellows program, recognized for visionary leadership in viral immunology and pandemic preparedness.
- 2026: Inducted as an honorary member of Alpha Kappa Alpha

== Selected works and publications ==
- Corbett, Kizzmekia Shanta (August 2014). Characterization of Human Antibody Responses to Dengue Virus Infections in a Sri Lankan Pediatric Cohort (Thesis). Chapel Hill, NC: University of North Carolina at Chapel Hill Graduate School. doi:10.17615/ajjc-6r57. Wikidata ()
- Corbett, Kizzmekia S.; Katzelnick, Leah; Tissera, Hasitha; Amerasinghe, Ananda; de Silva, Aruna Dharshan; de Silva, Aravinda M. (February 15, 2015). "Pre-existing Neutralizing Antibody Responses Distinguish Clinically Inapparent and Apparent Dengue Virus Infections in a Sri Lankan Pediatric Cohort". The Journal of Infectious Diseases. 211 (4): 590–599. doi:10.1093/infdis/jiu481. PMC 4375390. PMID 25336728. Wikidata ()
- Kirchdoerfer, Robert N.; Cottrell, Christopher A.; Wang, Nianshuang; Pallesen, Jesper; Yassine, Hadi M.; Turner, Hannah L.; Corbett, Kizzmekia S.; Graham, Barney S.; McLellan, Jason S.; Ward, Andrew B. (March 2, 2016). "Pre-fusion structure of a human coronavirus spike protein". Nature. 531 (7592): 118–121. Bibcode:2016Natur.531..118K. doi:10.1038/nature17200. ISSN 1476-4687. PMC 4860016. PMID 26935699. Wikidata ()
- Raut, Rajendra; Corbett, Kizzmekia S.; Tennekoon, Rashika N.; Premawansa, Sunil; Wijewickrama, Ananda; Premawansa, Gayani; Mieczkowski, Piotr; Rückert, Claudia; Ebel, Gregory D.; De Silva, Aruna D.; de Silva, Aravinda M. (January 2, 2019). "Dengue type 1 viruses circulating in humans are highly infectious and poorly neutralized by human antibodies" (PDF). Proceedings of the National Academy of Sciences. 116 (1): 227–232. Bibcode:2019PNAS..116..227R. doi:10.1073/pnas.1812055115. PMC 6320508. PMID 30518559. Wikidata ()
- Corbett, Kizzmekia S.; Moin, Syed M.; Yassine, Hadi M.; Cagigi, Alberto; Kanekiyo, Masaru; Boyoglu-Barnum, Seyhan; Myers, Sky I.; Tsybovsky, Yaroslav; Wheatley, Adam K.; Schramm, Chaim A.; Gillespie, Rebecca A.; Shi, Wei; Wang, Lingshu; Zhang, Yi; Andrews, Sarah F.; Joyce, M. Gordon; Crank, Michelle C.; Douek, Daniel C.; McDermott, Adrian B.; Mascola, John R.; Graham, Barney S.; Boyington, Jeffrey C.; Subbarao, Kanta (February 26, 2019). "Design of Nanoparticulate Group 2 Influenza Virus Hemagglutinin Stem Antigens That Activate Unmutated Ancestor B Cell Receptors of Broadly Neutralizing Antibody Lineages". mBio. 10 (1) e02810-18. doi:10.1128/mBio.02810-18. PMC 6391921. PMID 30808695. Wikidata ()
- Rosen, Osnat; Chan, Leo Li-Ying; Abiona, Olubukola M.; Gough, Portia; Wang, Lingshu; Shi, Wei; Zhang, Yi; Wang, Nianshuang; Kong, Wing-Pui; McLellan, Jason S.; Graham, Barney S.; Corbett, Kizzmekia S. (March 2019). "A high-throughput inhibition assay to study MERS-CoV antibody interactions using image cytometry". Journal of Virological Methods. 265: 77–83. doi:10.1016/j.jviromet.2018.11.009. PMC 6357230. PMID 30468747.
- Wang, Nianshuang; Rosen, Osnat; Wang, Lingshu; Turner, Hannah L.; Stevens, Laura J.; Corbett, Kizzmekia S.; Bowman, Charles A.; Pallesen, Jesper; Shi, Wei; Zhang, Yi; Leung, Kwanyee; Kirchdoerfer, Robert N.; Becker, Michelle M.; Denison, Mark R.; Chappell, James D.; Ward, Andrew B.; Graham, Barney S.; McLellan, Jason S. (September 24, 2019). "Structural Definition of a Neutralization-Sensitive Epitope on the MERS-CoV S1-NTD". Cell Reports. 28 (13): 3395–3405.e6. doi:10.1016/j.celrep.2019.08.052. PMC 6935267. PMID 31553909. Wikidata ()
- Boyoglu-Barnum, Seyhan; Hutchinson, Geoffrey B.; Boyington, Jeffrey C.; Moin, Syed M.; Gillespie, Rebecca A.; Tsybovsky, Yaroslav; Stephens, Tyler; Vaile, John R.; Lederhofer, Julia; Corbett, Kizzmekia S.; Fisher, Brian E.; Yassine, Hadi M.; Andrews, Sarah F.; Crank, Michelle C.; McDermott, Adrian B.; Mascola, John R.; Graham, Barney S.; Kanekiyo, Masaru (February 7, 2020). "Glycan repositioning of influenza hemagglutinin stem facilitates the elicitation of protective cross-group antibody responses". Nature Communications. 11 (1): 791. Bibcode:2020NatCo..11..791B. doi:10.1038/S41467-020-14579-4. PMC 7005838. PMID 32034141. Wikidata ()
- Wrapp, Daniel; Wang, Nianshuang; Corbett, Kizzmekia S.; Goldsmith, Jory A.; Hsieh, Ching-Lin; Abiona, Olubukola; Graham, Barney S.; McLellan, Jason S. (March 13, 2020). "Cryo-EM Structure of the 2019-nCoV Spike in the Prefusion Conformation". Science. 367 (6483): 1260–1263. Bibcode:2020Sci...367.1260W. doi:10.1126/science.abb2507. PMC 7164637. PMID 32075877. Wikidata ()
