= Winter (llama) =

Llama used in COVID virus research

Winter (born 16 January 2016) is a female llama who lives on a research farm near Ghent, Belgium and is notable for her role in award-winning research on the SARS-CoV2 virus.

In 2016 Jason McLellan and Daniel Wrapp in collaboration with Xavier Saelens chose the nine-month-old Winter as the llama they would inject with stabilized spike proteins from SARS-CoV-1 and MERS-CoV viruses, hoping that she would produce antibodies or the smaller nanobodies to further their aim "to isolate a single antibody that could neutralize all coronaviruses".

Camelids, including llamas, produce nanobodies, which are a form of antibody about half the size of human antibodies and are very stable and so can be easily manipulated.

When the genetic sequence of SARS-CoV-2 was released in January 2020, scientists worked quickly to test whether any of the antibodies that they had previously isolated against the original SARS-CoV (taken from Winter) could also bind and neutralize SARS-CoV-2. They discovered that one of these nanobodies, which they had characterized using the Argonne National Laboratory's Advanced Photon Source, might be effective against SARS-CoV-2. Jason McLellan and Daniel Wrapp received a 2020 Golden Goose Award for this research. This nanobody — called VHH72 — was further developed as a treatment for COVID-19 by Belgian scientists at Vlaams Instituut voor Biotechnologie, Ghent University and KU Leuven with spin-off company Exevir.

As of 2021 Llama Winter lives at LABIOMISTA, the arts and culture park of artist Koen Vanmechelen in Genk, Limburg, Belgium, where people can visit and learn more about her.
