= Jason McLellan =

American structural biologist

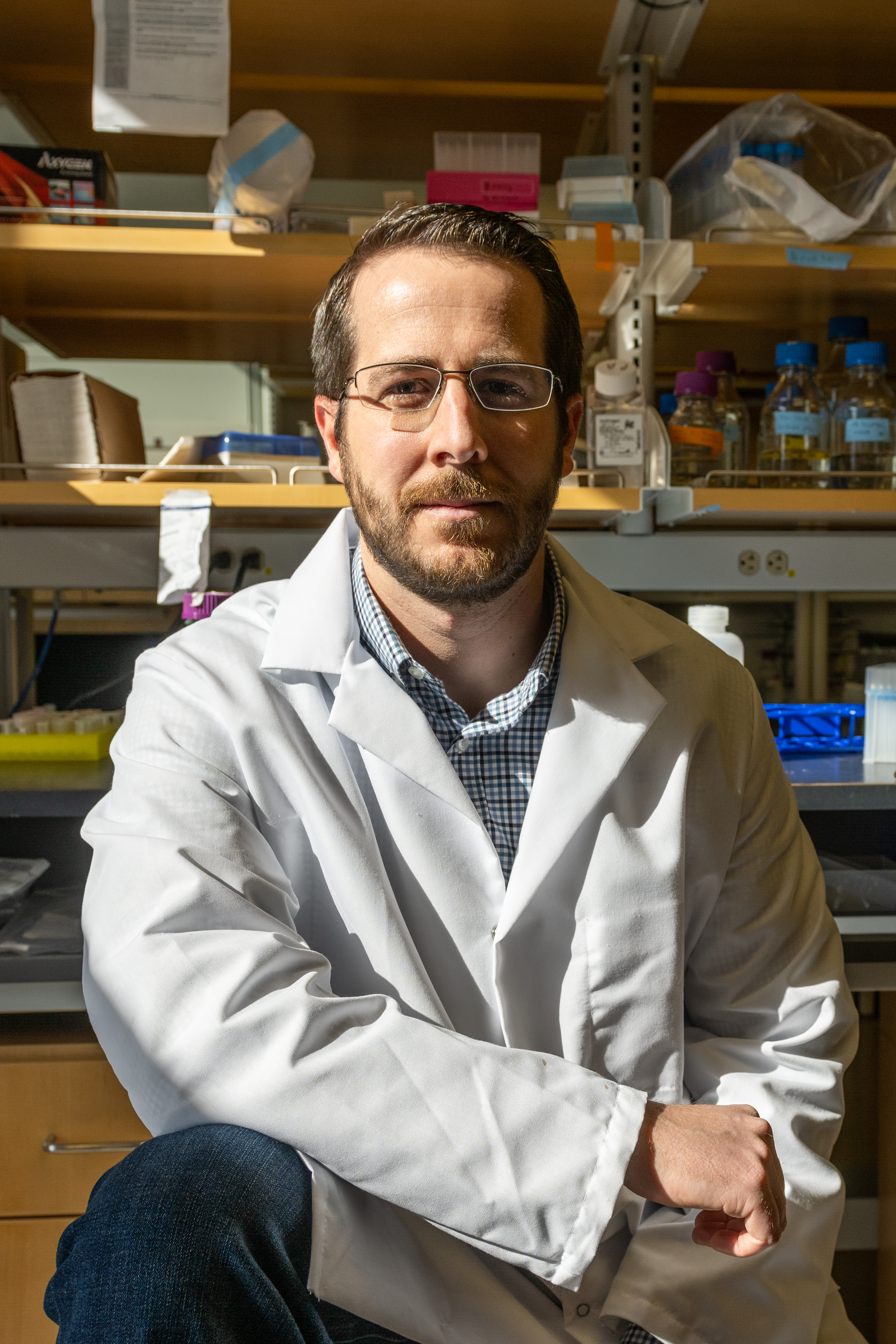
- Education: Wayne State University in Detroit, Michigan (BS in Chemistry); Johns Hopkins University School of Medicine in Baltimore, Maryland (PhD Biophysics); National Institutes of Health Vaccine Research Center (postdoctoral research)
- Scientific career
- Fields: Structural Biology
- Workplaces: University of Texas at Austin
- Website: www.mclellanlab.org

Jason S. McLellan is a structural biologist, professor in the Department of Molecular Biosciences and Robert A. Welch Chair in Chemistry at The University of Texas at Austin who specializes in understanding the structure and function of viral proteins, including those of coronaviruses. His research focuses on applying structural information to the rational design of vaccines and other therapies for viruses, including SARS-CoV-2, the novel coronavirus that causes COVID-19, and respiratory syncytial virus (RSV).

McLellan and his team collaborated with researchers at the National Institute of Allergy and Infectious Diseases’ Vaccine Research Center to design a stabilized version of the SARS-CoV-2 spike protein, which biotechnology company Moderna used as the basis for the vaccine mRNA-1273, the first COVID-19 vaccine candidate to enter phase I clinical trials in the U.S. At least three other vaccines use this modified spike protein: those from Pfizer and BioNTech; Johnson & Johnson and Janssen Pharmaceuticals; and Novavax. According to a June 2022 study published in the Lancet, COVID‑19 vaccines prevented between 14.4 and 19.8 million deaths globally in the first year they were available outside clinical trials.

== SARS-CoV-2 research ==
McLellan led a team from The University of Texas at Austin and the National Institute of Allergy and Infectious Diseases’ Vaccine Research Center that produced the first molecular structure, or 3D atomic scale map, of the novel coronavirus’ spike protein, the protein that allows the virus to attach to and infect host cells. The results were published online on February 19, 2020, in Science, one of the world's top academic journals, and were highlighted on the cover of the 13 March 2020 print edition.

The molecular structure provides a blueprint for scientists to learn to disrupt these processes through developing new treatments or vaccines. Aubree Gordon, an associate professor of epidemiology at the University of Michigan who was not a part of the study was quoted by LiveScience as saying: "It's a very important step forward and may help in the development of a vaccine against SARS-COV-2." The achievement was also highlighted as an important step towards a vaccine by the director of the National Institutes of Health, Francis Collins, in the NIH Director's Blog.

McLellan and his team collaborated with researchers at the National Institute of Allergy and Infectious Diseases’ Vaccine Research Center to design a stabilized version of the SARS-CoV-2 spike protein, called S-2P or 2P, which biotechnology company Moderna used as the basis for the vaccine candidate mRNA-1273, the first COVID-19 vaccine candidate to enter phase I clinical trials in the U.S. The UT Austin and NIH teams filed a joint patent application on the mutated spike protein.

Moderna's vaccine candidate, mRNA-1273, contains the genetic code for the stabilized version of the spike protein. When a person is vaccinated with mRNA-1273, their own cells should theoretically produce these modified spike proteins, triggering their immune systems to develop antibodies against the actual coronavirus.

The SARS-CoV-2 spike protein takes on one shape before entering a cell and another shape after, known as the prefusion and postfusion conformations. Antibodies that recognize spike proteins in the prefusion shape are much more effective at preventing infection than antibodies that recognize spike proteins in the postfusion shape. McLellan—along with his team members Daniel Wrapp and Nianshuang Wang, plus Barney Graham and Kizzmekia Corbett at NIAID's Vaccine Research Center—engineered the spike protein to stay in its initial shape so it can be recognized. This, combined with Moderna's technology that uses messenger RNA to encode information about the virus, allows mRNA-1273 to trigger an immune response in vaccinated subjects.

The stabilized spike protein developed by McLellan and his colleagues forms the basis of three COVID-19 vaccines that received emergency use authorization in the U.S.

In May, 2020, he published a new version of the stabilized SARS-CoV-2 spike protein called HexaPro that is currently being used as the basis for a new vaccine, NDV-HXP-S, which is undergoing trials in Brazil, Mexico, Thailand and Vietnam. These new vaccines are using a harmless avian virus that causes Newcastle Disease. This vaccine has the benefit of being easy to grow in chicken eggs, which are the basis of existing Influenza vaccines and are easier for developing nations to produce.

McLellan and his team worked with pharmaceutical company Eli Lilly and Company to develop their monoclonal antibody treatment bamlanivimab (LY-CoV555), which received emergency use authorization from the U.S. Food and Drug Administration in November 2020. In April 2021, the EUA was revoked.

In a separate but related project, McLellan and Daniel Wrapp worked with colleagues at the NIAID Vaccine Research Center and Ghent University to develop an antibody therapy for COVID-19 based on antibodies produced by a Winter (llama), a llama. Initial tests indicate that their antibody blocks viruses that display the SARS-CoV-2 spike protein from infecting cells in culture. They reported their findings in Cell on May 5, 2020. As of May 2020, the team was preparing to conduct preclinical studies in animals such as hamsters or nonhuman primates, with the hopes of next testing in humans.

== RSV research ==
Respiratory syncytial virus (RSV) is a very common, contagious virus that causes infections of the respiratory tract. RSV is the single most common cause of respiratory hospitalization in infants, reinfection remains common throughout the lifetime, and it is an important pathogen in all age groups.

McLellan, along with Barney S. Graham and Peter Kwong of the National Institute of Allergy and Infectious Diseases' Vaccine Research Center, spearheaded the development of a protein subunit vaccine against RSV called DS-Cav1. When the work began, McLellan was a postdoctoral researcher at VRC working in Graham's and Kwong's labs.

The antigen of this RSV vaccine, a stabilized version of the virus' F protein, was developed using structure-based vaccine design. Structure-based vaccines are developed through a rational design process that uses information about the atomic structure of vulnerable parts of a pathogen to create a synthetic molecule that the human immune system recognizes as pathogenic and creates potent antibodies against.

In a phase 1 clinical trial, DS-Cav1 was shown to be safe and to elicit "a robust boost in RSV F-specific antibodies and neutralising activity that was sustained above baseline for at least 44 weeks", according to a study published in April 2021 in The Lancet Respiratory Medicine.

The first FDA-approved RSV vaccine, AREXVY (developed by GSK plc), uses a version of this antigen and was approved in May 2023 for adults aged 60 and older by the U.S. Food and Drug Administration (FDA).

As of October 10, 2022, at least three other companies are testing candidate RSV vaccines based on stabilized prefusion F proteins in older adults in Phase 3 trials: Pfizer, Johnson & Johnson, and Moderna.

== Honors and awards ==
In 2020, Jason McLellan was one of seven researchers honored with a Golden Goose Award from the American Association for the Advancement of Science in recognition of COVID-19 research. He was the 2020 recipient of the William Prusoff Memorial Award from the International Society for Antiviral Research, which honors a young scientist who has shown excellence in antiviral research and promise for future contributions to the field. Previous honors include the Norman P. Salzman Memorial Award in Virology (2012), the Charles H. Hood Foundation Child Health Research Award (2015), the American Crystallographic Association Etter Early Career Award (2018) and the Viruses Young Investigator in Virology Prize (2019).

The Academy of Medicine, Engineering & Science of Texas awarded McLellan its 2022 Edith and Peter O'Donnell Award in Medicine. Also in 2022, Dartmouth College awarded McLellan the inaugural McGuire Family Prize for Societal Impact, and he was named a finalist for the Blavatnik National Award for Young Scientists. In 2023, he was chosen for the NAS Award in Molecular Biology and the Welch Foundation's Norman Hackerman Award in Chemical Research, and named a Senior Member of the National Academy of Inventors. In 2024, he was honored with a 2024 IVI-SK bioscience Park MahnHoon Award by the International Vaccine Institute. In 2025, he was selected for induction into the National Inventors Hall of Fame.

In October 2025, McLellan was named to the MacArthur Fellows Program, popularly known as the MacArthur Foundation's "Genius Award."
