= Tiffany Field =

American psychologist

- Born: La Crosse, Wisconsin, U.S.
- Education: University of Cincinnati, Tufts University, University of Massachusetts, Amherst
- Occupations: Professor, University of Miami School of Medicine

Tiffany Martini Field is professor in the departments of pediatrics, psychology, and psychiatry at the University of Miami School of Medicine and director of the Touch Research Institute. She specializes in infant development, especially with regard to the impact of maternal postpartum depression on mother-infant interaction and the efficacy of massage and touch therapy in promoting growth and emotional well-being in premature and low birth weight infants.

Field received the American Psychological Association Boyd McCandless Award for distinguished early career contributions to developmental psychology in 1979. In 2014, Field became the first psychologist to receive the Golden Goose Award for federally funded research on infant massage, an honor she shared with Saul Schanberg, Cynthia Kuhn, and Gary Evoniuk who established the beneficial effects of massage on growth in studies of rat pups.

Field is an author whose books include The Amazing Infant, Infancy, Touch, Touch Therapy, Complementary and Alternative Therapies Research, and Massage Therapy Research, as well as edited volumes.

== Early life and education ==
Field attended the University of Cincinnati, where she studied Psychology and completed her bachelor's degree in 1963. She continued her education at Tufts University, earning a master's degree in Occupational Therapy in 1965 and a second master's degree in Child Studies in 1973. Field subsequently attended the University of Massachusetts Amherst and graduated with a PhD in Developmental Psychology in 1976.

== Career ==
After a year as a visiting professor at the University of Massachusetts, Amherst, Field joined the faculty of the Mailman Center for Child Development at the University of Miami Medical School in 1977. She has remained at the University of Miami Medical School throughout her career with a joint appointment to the Fielding Graduate University.

Field's research has been supported by grants from the National Institutes of Health (Senior Research Scientist Award), the National Institute of Mental Health (Research Scientist Development Award; Merit Award), the National Institute of Child Health and Human Development, National Institute on Drug Abuse, the National Center for Complementary and Alternative Medicine, the United States Department of Health & Human Services Administration on Children, Youth and Families, the March of Dimes, Johnson & Johnson, and Gerber corporations.

Field's research has focused on the effectiveness of massage therapy for stimulating growth in preterm infants. In one of her studies, premature infants received tactile/kinesthetic stimulation, consisting of body stroking and passive movements of the limbs, 3 times per day for 15 minutes over a 10-day period. These infants showed greater weight gain, were more active and alert, and were discharged from the hospital on average of six days earlier than a control group of premature infants who were not massaged. Other research has focused on how massage during pregnancy and labor benefits the mother by decreasing levels of the stress hormone cortisol. In one study, pregnant women who received massage therapy for five weeks reported less anxiety, depression and leg and back pain than a control group who received relaxation therapy.

Extending her research on the benefits of touch to treatments for pain, Field and her colleagues conducted research demonstrating that regular massages (15 minutes a day for 30 days) reduced pain among children suffering from rheumatoid arthritis when compared with a control group receiving relaxation therapy. Other work demonstrated similar benefits for adults suffering arthritis pain. In research focusing on the use of alternative therapies with elderly individuals, Field and her colleagues have demonstrated benefits of movement therapy, massage, yoga, and tai chi.

== Publications ==
- Field, T. M. (1995). Infants of depressed mothers. Infant Behavior and Development, 18(1), 1–13
- Field, T. M. (1998). Massage therapy effects. American Psychologist, 53(12), 1270–1281
- Field, T. M., Healy, B. T., Goldstein, S., & Guthertz, M. (1990). Behavior-state matching and synchrony in mother-infant interactions of nondepressed versus depressed dyads. Developmental Psychology, 26(1), 7–14
- Field, T. M., Schanberg, S. M., Scafidi, F., Bauer, C. R., Vega-Lahr, N., Garcia, R., ... & Kuhn, C. M. (1986). Tactile/kinesthetic stimulation effects on preterm neonates. Pediatrics, 77(5), 654–658
- Field, T. M., Woodson, R., Greenberg, R., & Cohen, D. (1982). Discrimination and imitation of facial expression by neonates. Science, 218(4568), 179–181
- Field, T. M. (2024). Anxiety Disorders: A Narrative Review. Journal of Clinical Psychology and Neurology, 2(4), 1–6
