= Thomas Dyer Seeley =

American biochemist

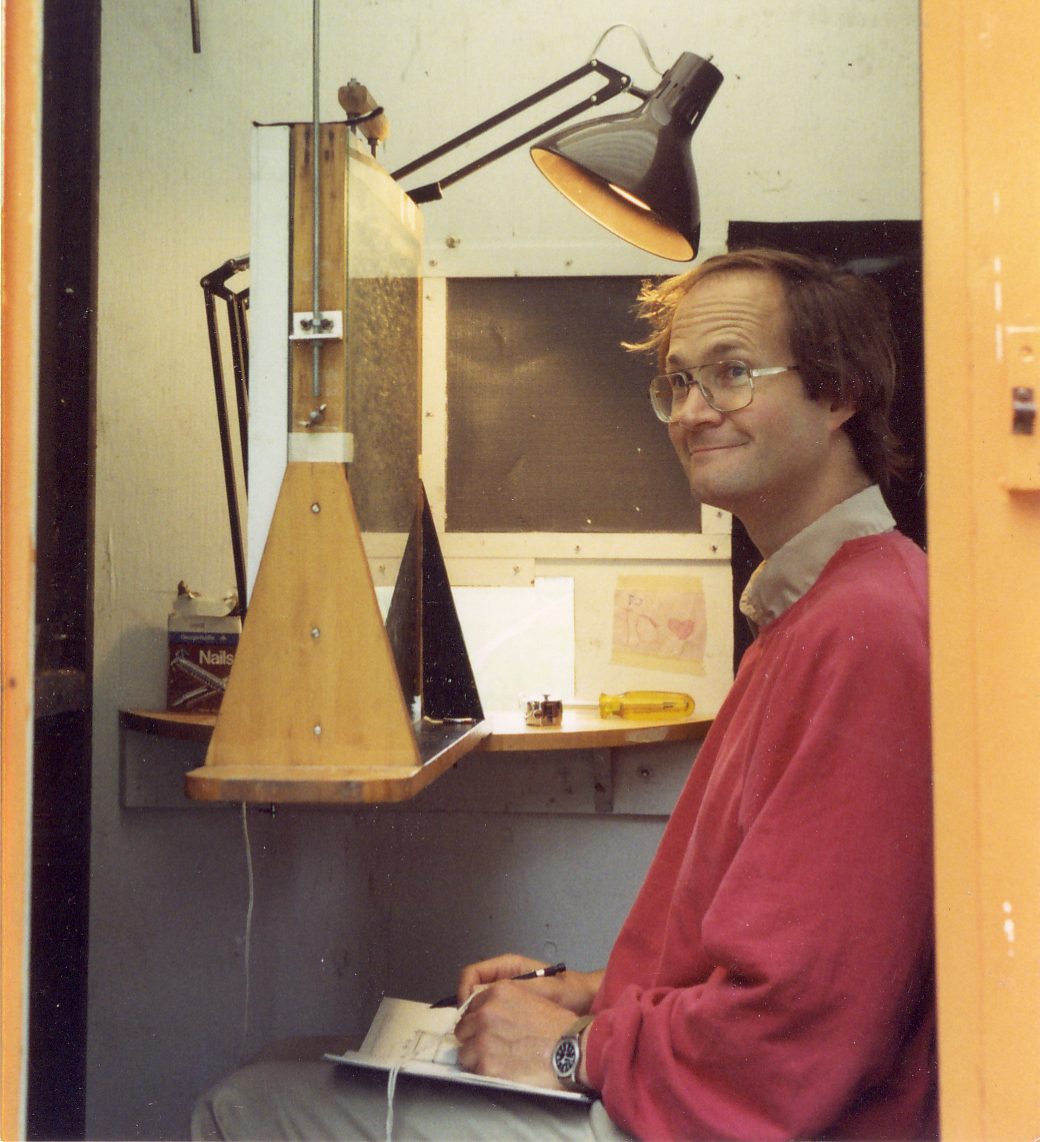
- Seeley with observation hive of honey bees, in hut that he designed and constructed. Cranberry Lake Biological Station, New York, c. 1992.
- Born: June 17, 1952 (age 74); Ellis Hollow, New York, US
- Education: Dartmouth College, Harvard University
- Scientific career
- Fields: Honey bee behavior
- Workplaces: Cornell University
- Doctoral advisor: Bert Hölldobler and E. O. Wilson

Thomas Dyer Seeley is the Horace White Professor in Biology in the Department of Neurobiology and Behavior at Cornell University. He is the author of several books on honeybee behavior, including Honeybee Democracy (2010) and The Wisdom of the Hive (1995) He was the recipient of the Humboldt Prize in Biology in 2001. He primarily studies swarm intelligence by investigating how bees collectively make decisions.

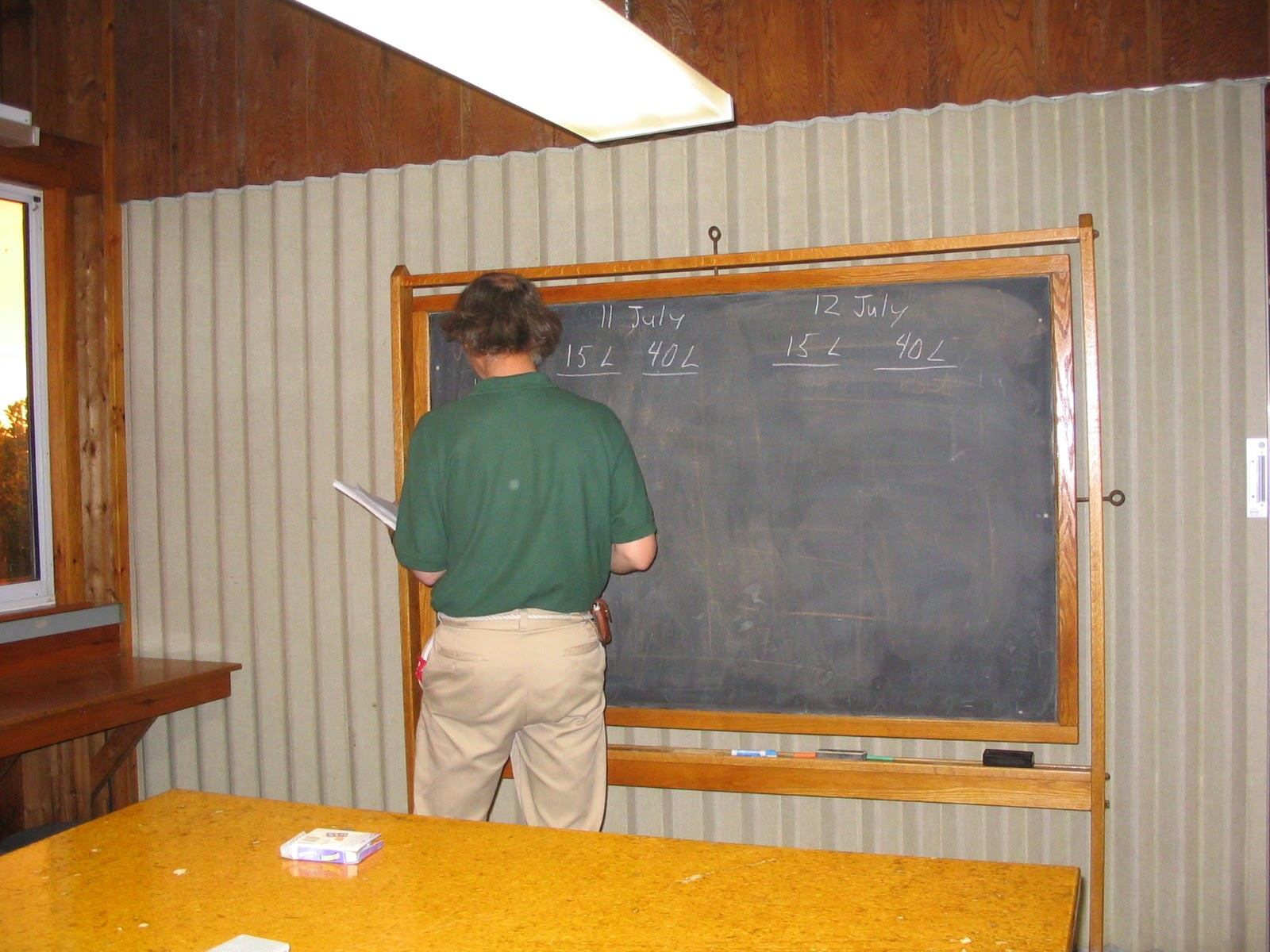
Seeley writing on a blackboard in a cabin at Shoals Marine Laboratory, Appledore Island, c. 2007

== Background ==
Seeley was born on June 17, 1952. He grew up in Ellis Hollow, New York, and went to elementary, middle and high schools in Ithaca, New York. As a high school student he held summer jobs with Royse P. Murphy, a plant geneticist at Cornell University, and Roger Morse, at the Dyce Laboratory for Honey Bee Studies at Cornell.

== Education ==
Seeley enrolled at Dartmouth College in 1970, intending to follow the premedical curriculum, but changed his focus after reading E. O. Wilson’s book The Insect Societies. Seeley received his A.B. (summa cum laude) in Chemistry from Dartmouth College in 1974 and, four years later, his Ph.D. in Biology from Harvard University. His Ph.D. advisors were Bert Hölldobler and E. O. Wilson.

== Appointments ==
Seeley held the following academic appointments:

Year	Appointment
1978-1980	Junior Fellow, Society of Fellows, Harvard University
1980-1986	Assistant and associate professor, Yale University
1986-1992	Assistant and associate professor, Cornell University
1992–present	Professor of Biology, Cornell University
1993-1994	Visiting Fellow, Institute for Advanced Study, Berlin
2001-2004	Visiting professor, University of Würzburg
2005–08, 13-14	chairman, Cornell University, Department of Neurobiology and Behavior
2013-	Horace White Professor in Biology, Cornell University

== Honors and awards ==
In 1966 Seeley was an Eagle Scout. In 1974 he received the Hartshorne Chemistry Medal from Dartmouth College. Four years later he was elected a Junior Fellow at Harvard's Society of Fellows and in 1983 he was awarded the Morse Prize Fellowship from Yale University. For a year from 1992, he was a Guggenheim Fellow and then the next year got a Fellowship from Berlin's Institute for Advanced Study. In 1994 he received The James I. Hambleton Memorial Award from the Eastern Apicultural Society.

In 1998 he received the gold medal for the Best Science Book, (The Wisdom of the Hive). Seeley received the Alexander von Humboldt's Senior Scientist Prize in 2001 and was elected a Fellow of the American Academy of Arts and Sciences that same year. In 2008 he was an elected fellow for the Animal Behavior Society and in 2013 he gave the keynote address at the 33rd International Apimondia Congress in Kyiv. In 2017 he was awarded fellowship to American Association for the Advancement of Science.

A species of bee, Neocorynurella seeleyi, was named after him in 1997. Seeley was awarded the Golden Goose Award in 2016 for his work on The Honeybee Algorithm.

In 2019 he became a member of the German Academy of Sciences Leopoldina.

== Publications ==
Seeley has authored 6 books, at least 1 newspaper article, and over 175 scholarly publications.

=== Books ===
- Honeybee Ecology: A Study of Adaptation in Social Life, published by Princeton University Press
- The Wisdom of the Hive: The Social Physiology of Honeybee Colonies
- Honeybee Democracy, published by the Princeton University Press.
- Following the Wild Bees: The Craft and Science of Beehunting
- The Lives of Bees: The Untold Story of the Honey Bee in the Wild
- Piping Hot Bees and Boisterous Buzz-Runners: 20 Mysteries of Honey Bee Behavior Solved, published by Princeton University Press.
