= Paul Zubeil =

German Government Health Expert

- Born: 27 November 1975 (age 50); Basel, Switzerland
- Occupations: Deputy Director-General European and International Health Politics
- Organization(s): Federal Ministry of Health, Germany

Paul Zubeil (born 27 November 1975 in Basel) currently serves as the Deputy Director‑General for European and International Health Politics at the German Federal Ministry of Health (BMG) and is a German global health expert. Zubeil is known for his work in multilateral governance, health diplomacy, pandemic preparedness, and global health financing. His career includes roles within international organizations such as the United Nations, and leading Germany’s health policy engagements with the G7 and G20.

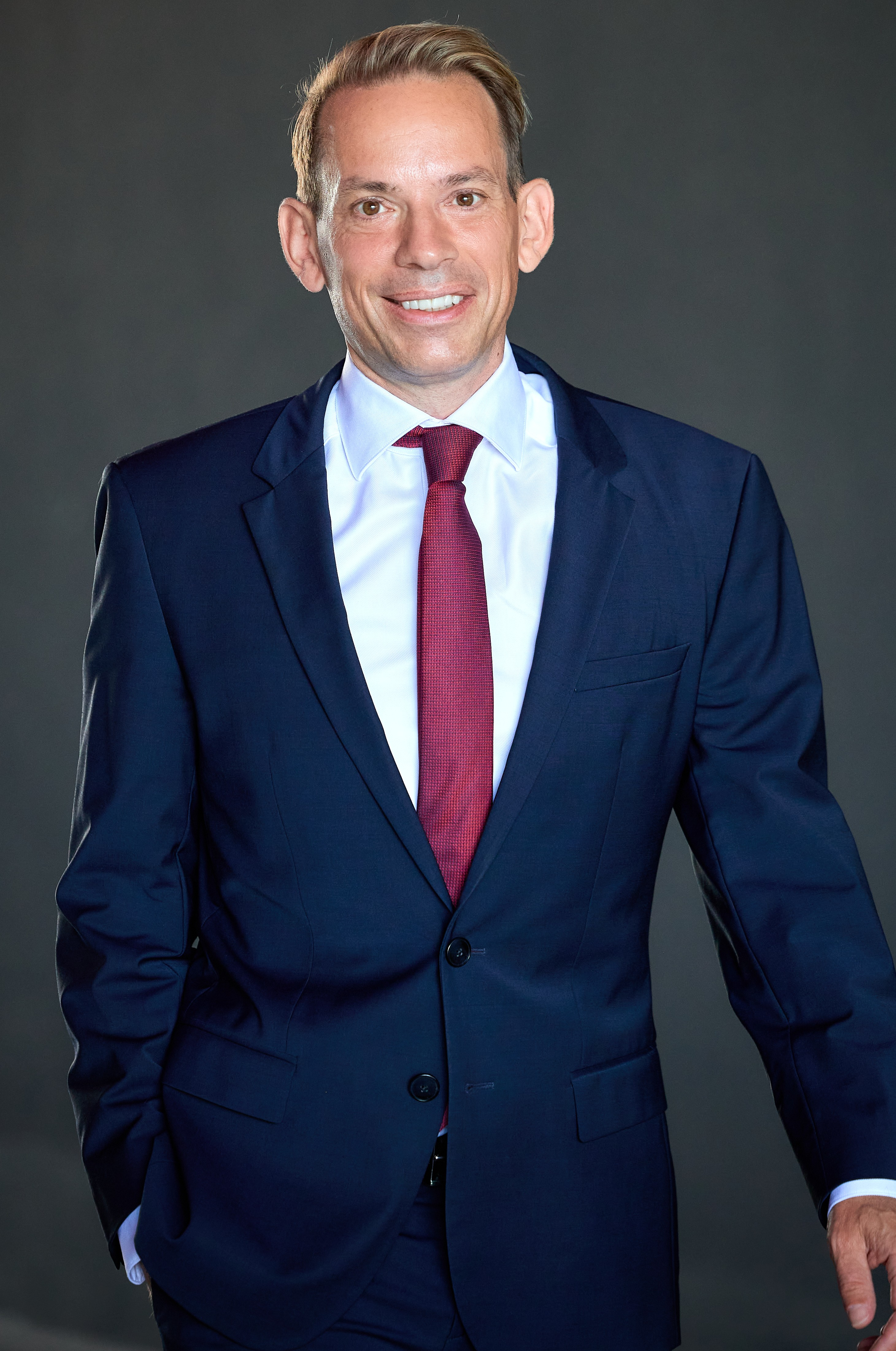
Paul Zubeil

== Early life and education ==
Zubeil studied Business Administration at the University of Mannheim (MSc) and Public Health at the London School of Hygiene & Tropical Medicine. He holds a diploma in Strategic Public Procurement from the UK’s Chartered Institute of Purchasing & Supply.

== Career ==
=== Early career ===
In his early career, Zubeil held finance and budget roles at the UNFPA Headquarters in New York and served as a Liaison Officer to the European Commission.

=== UNFPA senior leadership ===
Zubeil held multiple senior roles within the UNFPA from 2009 to 2021. In 2012, he served in an interim capacity with the UNFPA in the Democratic Republic of Congo, leading operational reforms to strengthen governance and financial accountability. Zubeil then servied as Chief of Operations for the UNFPA in Haiti (2013–2017), managing emergency operations in a humanitarian context. He was appointed as Deputy Director and Senior Policy and Strategic Partnerships Adviser from 2017 to 2021 at the UNFPA Liaison Office to the European Commission in Brussels, where he managed donor relations and institutional coordination. Zubeil directed operational and financial reporting structures and represented the agency in high-level EU political forums.

=== German Federal Ministry of Health (2021–present) ===
Since February 2021, Zubeil has led Germany’s European and International health strategies at the Federal Ministry of Health. His responsibilities include leading health policy engagements with the European Union and the G7 and G20 health processes. In September 2024, he presented the federal government’s review process on global health architecture to the Bundestag’s Subcommittee on Global Health. Since 1 January 2026, Zubeil represents Germany on the OECD Health Committee, serving as a member of its Bureau, which leads the OECD’s work on comparative health system analysis and evidence-based health policy coordination among member states, succeeding Lars Schade (President of the Robert Koch Institute) in this role.

== Global health leadership and engagement ==
=== Global health diplomacy and governance ===
Zubeil is an advocate for reforming global health organizations and architecture to optimize systems and drive improved health outcomes for all populations. His work is grounded in the conviction that inclusive leadership and UN reform, at both global and regional levels, are the cornerstones of an international health system that is resilient, equitable, and effective. Zubeil’s contributions and leadership have earned him the endorsement of prominent global health leaders, including Winnie Byanyima and Helen Clark.

Zubeil regularly serves as co-chair and panelist at major international conferences on global public health. He has contributed to discussions at events such as the World Health Summit, the Global Health Talk, the European Health Forum Gastein, and the Catalyst Dialogue on Global Health Architecture. At the 2022 Catalyst Dialogue, he addressed fragmentation in global health institutions and the need for greater coherence and coordination. In 2025, at the Global Health Talk, he highlighted challenges in global health financing, advocating for coordinated solutions and efforts to rebuild donor confidence to sustain health initiatives.

=== UNAIDS and HIV/AIDS policy ===
Zubeil has been a key leader in the global HIV/AIDS response through his engagement with UNAIDS. As Chair of the 53rd UNAIDS Programme Coordinating Board representing Germany, he facilitated institutional dialogue and strategic decision-making during a critical period of transformation for the Joint Programme. In the context of the UN80 reform plan and the proposal to sunset UNAIDS by 2026, Zubeil emerged as an influential voice of reason, expressing concern that abrupt structural changes could prioritize the appearance of integration over real effectiveness. While supporting the need for reform, he advocated for a measured approach that avoids panic and safeguards the unique, life-saving functions of the Joint Programme.

=== Prospective WHO Director-General candidate ===
According to prominent German and international media outlets, Zubeil has emerged as one of the leading global contenders for the 2027 Director-General race at the World Health Organization. Health Policy Watch featured Zubeil among eleven other prospective candidates, citing his reputation for fiscal discipline, institutional turnaround, and his potential to bring the United States back on board.

== Personal life ==
Zubeil is married to Hendrik Streeck, Professor of Virology, Member of the German Bundestag, and Federal Government Commissioner for Addiction and Drug Issues.
