= COVID-19 Case-Cluster-Study =

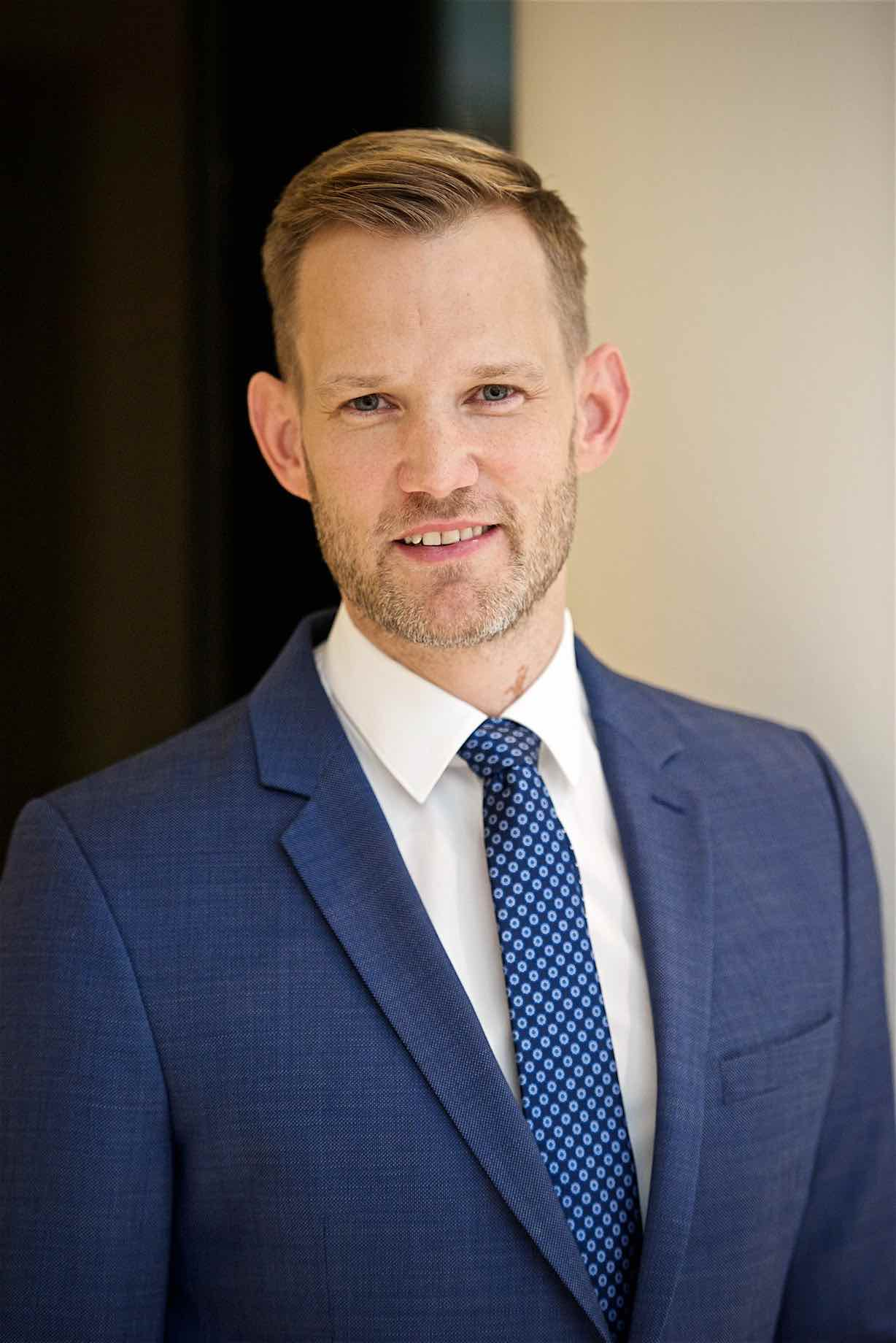
Hendrik Streeck, principal investigator

The COVID-19 Case-Cluster-Study – colloquially, Heinsberg study, also known as Heinsbergprotokoll and HEINSBERG PROTOKOLL. – is a study about the COVID-19 pandemic in Gangelt.

The study was commissioned and is co-financed by the government of North Rhine-Westphalia and is led by Hendrik Streeck. The results of the study garnered cross-national media attention.

The study aimed to determine lethality of and immunity to SARS-CoV-2; it also estimated the number of unrecorded cases.

== Criticism ==
The studiy's method of calculating the IFR, which represents the lethality of COVID-19, was criticized in a report by Medwatch. The number of deaths were counted only for a period of 14 days. Because deaths accumulate over many weeks rather than directly after the infection, the study captured barely half the related deaths. This alone meant that the IFR was almost twice as high as calculated. When the study was published in Nature Communications in November 2020, the authors had not revised their calculation.

In response to criticism of their method of sampling, principal investigator Streeck claimsed they examined more persons than recommended by the World Health Organization.
