= OpenFlexure Microscope =

Open-source 3D-printed microscope

- OpenFlexure Microscope V7-beta4
- Developer: OpenFlexure Project (core team at the University of Glasgow)
- Hardware licence: CERN-OHL-S-2.0
- Software licence: GPL-3.0 (server)
- Size: Within 15 × 15 × 20 cm (5.9 × 5.9 × 7.9 in)
- Mass: About 500 g (18 oz) (highest-resolution, fully automated configuration)
- Stage travel: 12 × 12 × 4 mm (0.47 × 0.47 × 0.16 in)
- Step size: As low as 50 nm (z), 70 nm (x, y)
- Website: openflexure.org

The OpenFlexure Microscope is an open-source, 3D-printed laboratory microscope with motorised sample positioning and focus control. It uses a mechanical stage built from plastic flexures and is designed so that it can be manufactured and maintained locally.

== History ==
A one-piece 3D-printed flexure translation stage for microscopy was described in 2016 by J. P. Sharkey, D. C. W. Foo, A. Kabla, J. J. Baumberg and R. W. Bowman. The microscope itself was presented in a 2020 paper in Biomedical Optics Express by authors at the University of Bath and the University of Cambridge together with partners in Tanzania, the Ifakara Health Institute and STICLab in Dar es Salaam. The paper was received on 12 December 2019 and published on 8 April 2020.

The project was originally based mainly at the University of Bath and the University of Cambridge; its core development team is now at the University of Glasgow. The microscope has been built and used in more than 50 countries.

== Design ==
=== Hardware ===
The positioning mechanism is a flexure design that gives 3-axis motion, with step sizes as low as 50 nanometres along the z axis and 70 nm along x and y, and a travel of 12 × 12 × 4 millimetres (0.47 × 0.47 × 0.16 in). Because the stage uses plastic flexures, its motion is free from friction and vibration, and most of the microscope, including all the parts with flexures, prints as a single piece. The microscope fits within 15 × 15 × 20 centimetres (5.9 × 5.9 × 7.9 in) and weighs about 500 grams (18 oz) in its highest-resolution, fully automated configuration. The plastic construction limits its load capacity, so it is not suited to very large or heavy samples.

Thin blood smear with malaria parasites (ring-form trophozoite of Plasmodium falciparum) imaged on an OpenFlexure Microscope with a 100× oil-immersion objective

The optics can be changed, ranging from a webcam lens to a 100× oil-immersion objective. Other options include transmission and reflection illumination, polarisation contrast and epi-fluorescence imaging.

Composite image of an H&E-stained stomach sample collected with an OpenFlexure Microscope using a 60× objective

The lowest-cost version has no motors, uses a webcam for sensor and optics, and has no microcomputer. At the time it was presented, its estimated cost was about US$5 for PLA, about US$5 for the webcam, and about US$5 for common hardware if bought in bulk or about US$26 if bought in single packs, excluding the 3D printer.

=== Variants ===
The OpenFlexure Delta Stage is a separate 3D-printed design for researchers that runs on the same software, and has been used for imaging modes including brightfield, epi-fluorescence, darkfield, Rheinberg and differential phase contrast.

=== Software ===
The control software is split into client and server applications that communicate through a web API conforming to the W3C Web of Things standard. The server software provides an API server and web interface for the microscope.

== Local production ==
By 2020 more than 100 microscopes had been produced in Tanzania and Kenya for educational, scientific and clinical applications. Production sites include STICLab's facility in Dar es Salaam and the partner Tech for Trade in Nairobi, and the designs have also been replicated in maker spaces and academic labs in countries including Peru, Germany, Ghana, the United States and the United Kingdom.

== Licensing ==
The hardware design is released under the CERN Open Hardware Licence, strongly reciprocal, version 2.0 or later (CERN-OHL-S-2.0). The server software is licensed under the GNU General Public License version 3. The project does not sell microscopes itself, but several companies do.

== See also ==
- Foldscope
