= IntraLase =

Medical laser manufacturer

- Industry: Medical
- Successor: Abbott Laboratories
- Headquarters: Irvine, California

IntraLase was a company based in Irvine, California, producing lasers for the medical industry and for eye surgery.

The femtosecond laser, developed by IntraLase corporation and now owned by AMO, is trademarked under the name IntraLase. It is used to perform IntraLASIK eye surgery.

== Acquisition ==
In March 2007, it was acquired by Advanced Medical Optics for $808 million in cash.

Advanced Medical Optics was acquired by Abbott Laboratories in February 2009.
