= Manu Prakash =

Biophysicist

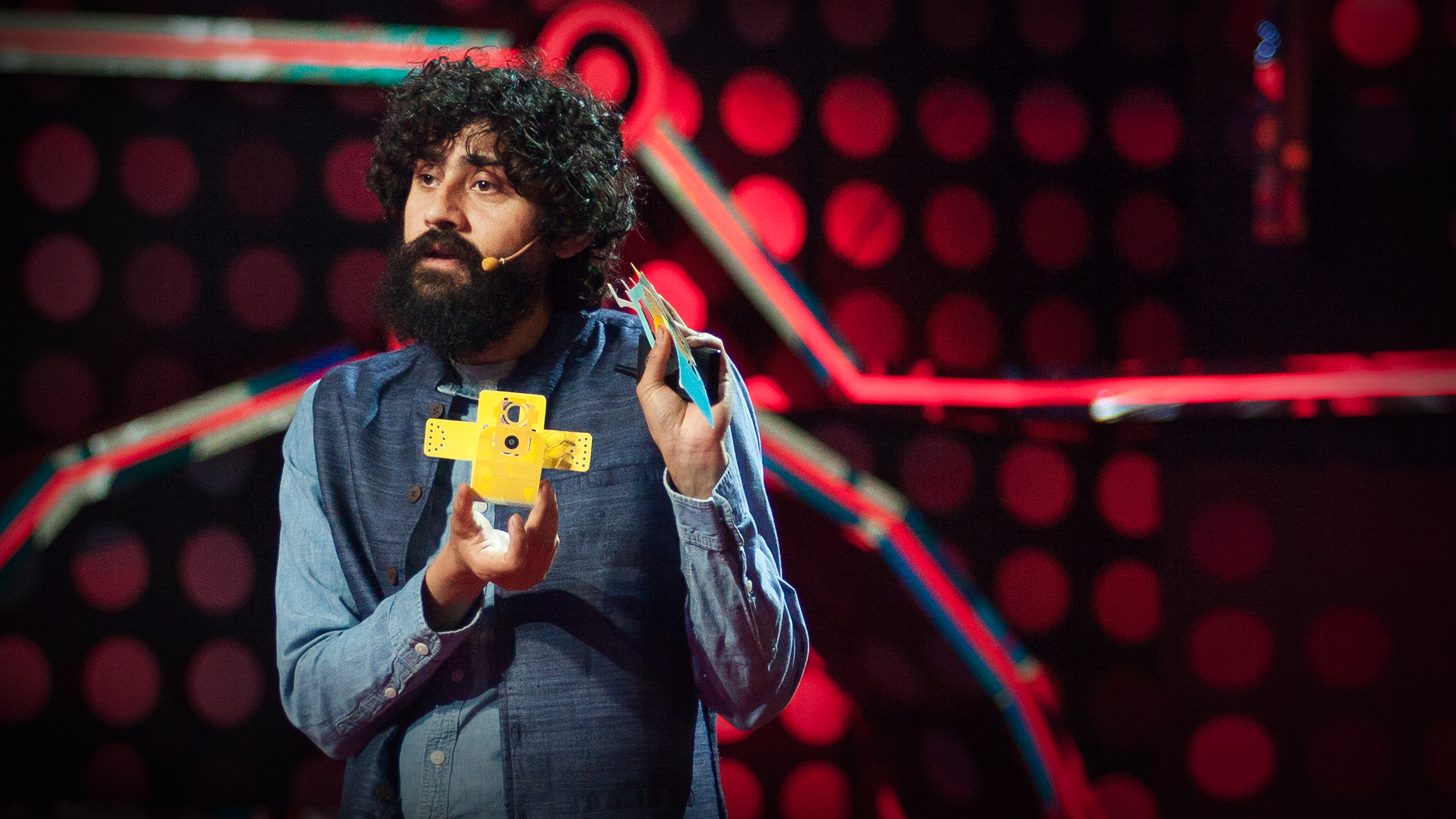
- Prakash at TED (2017)
- Education: MIT, IIT Kanpur
- Known for: Foldscope, Paperfuge
- Awards: MacArthur Fellows Program (2016), TED Senior Fellow (2011)
- Scientific career
- Fields: Bioengineering
- Workplaces: Stanford University
- Doctoral advisor: Neil Gershenfeld

Manu Prakash is an Indian scientist who is a professor of bioengineering at Stanford University. Manu was born in Meerut, India. He is best known for his contributions to the Foldscope and Paperfuge. Prakash received the MacArthur Fellowship in September 2016. He and his team at Stanford University have developed a synchronous computer that operates using the physics of moving water droplets. His work focuses on frugal innovation that makes medicine, computing and microscopy accessible to more people across the world.

== Early life and education ==
Manu Prakash was born in Meerut, India. He earned a BTech in computer science and engineering from the Indian Institute of Technology Kanpur and an M.S. and PhD in Applied Physics from Massachusetts Institute of Technology.

== Notable work ==
=== Foldscope ===
A Foldscope is an optical microscope that can be assembled from simple components, including a sheet of paper and a lens. It was developed by Jim Cybulski and Manu Prakash and designed to cost less than US$1 to build. It is part of the "frugal science" movement, which aims to make cheap and easy tools available for scientific use in the developing world.

=== Paperfuge ===
Paperfuge is a hand-powered ultralow-cost paper centrifuge designed by Manu Prakash and members of the Prakash Lab. Inspired by the whirlygig toy configuration, Dr. Manu designed a centrifuge using the toy's design and Supercoiling-mediated ultrafast spinning dynamics. The Paperfuge can be used to separate Plasma and RBC for rapid Malaria diagnosis in remote areas.

== Awards ==
TED Fellow 2009, TED Fellow 2010, TED Senior Fellow 2011

Gates Foundation Global Health "Explorations" Grant 2012

NIH Director's New Innovator Award 2015

MacArthur Fellow 2016

Unilever Colworth Prize 2020
