= Foldscope =

Low cost microscope

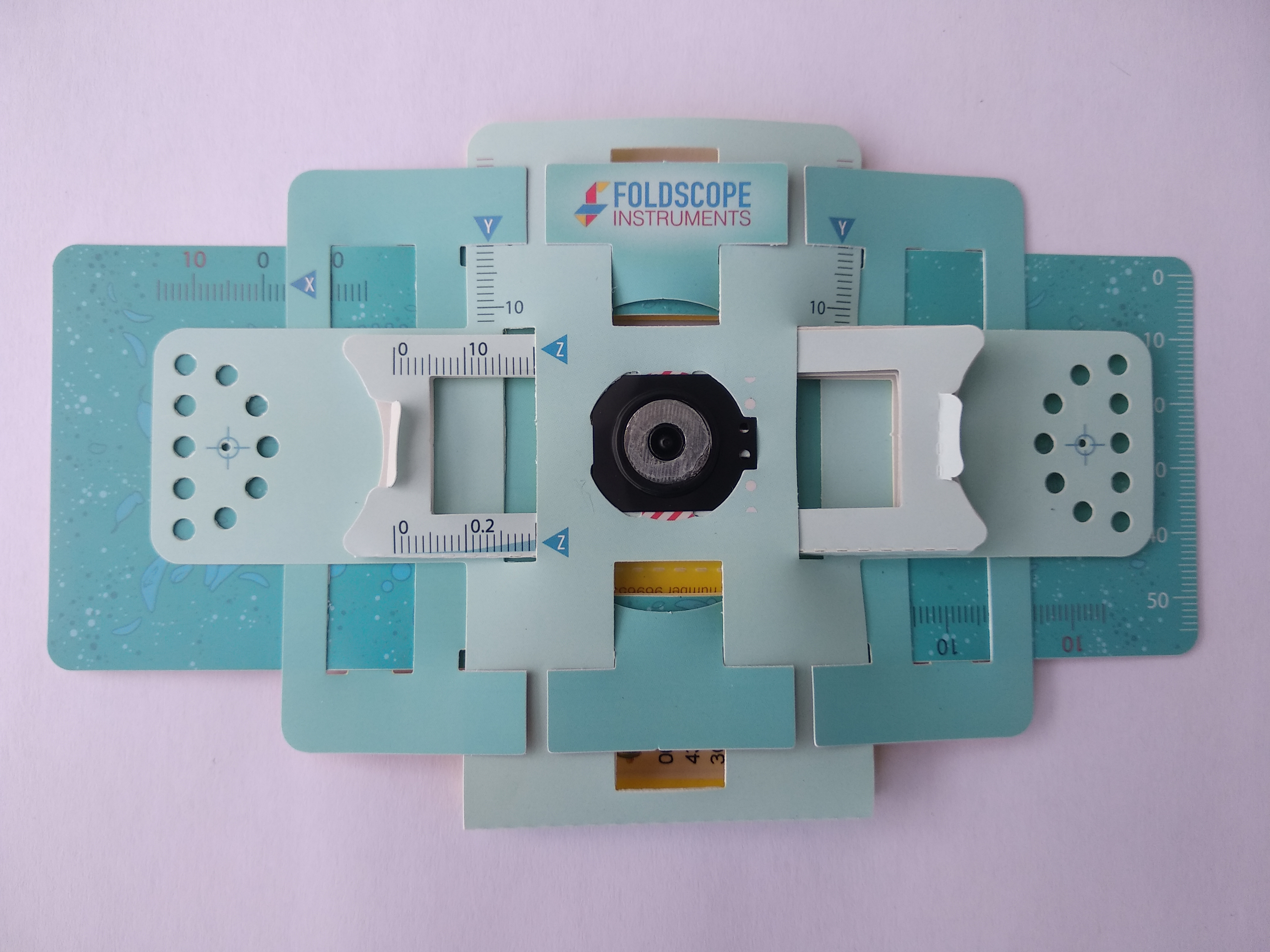
A Foldscope

Assembling a Foldscope

A Foldscope is an optical microscope that can be assembled from simple components, including a sheet of paper and a lens. It was created by Manu Prakash and designed to cost less than US$1 to build. It is a part of the "frugal science" movement which aims to make cheap and easy tools available for scientific use in the developing world.

== History ==
The basic principle of using a small spherical lens held close to the eye dates back to the time of Antonie van Leeuwenhoek (1632–1723), who was the first to see single-celled organisms using such a lens held in a device of his own design.

The Foldscope was developed by a team led by Manu Prakash, an assistant professor of bioengineering at the Stanford School of Medicine. The project was funded by several organisations including the Bill & Melinda Gates Foundation, which gave a grant of US$100,000 for research in November 2012.

The idea for creating a low-cost microscope came to Prakash in 2011 while he was at a field station in Thailand. He remarked that the station had a very expensive microscope but that everyone was afraid to use it because it was fragile and worth more than most people's salaries. He wanted to create an affordable microscope that would be versatile and sturdy enough to work in field conditions. He also wanted to create a device that people felt they had ownership of, which is part of the reason the Foldscope comes in a kit to be assembled. He developed the first prototype in 2014.

== Details ==
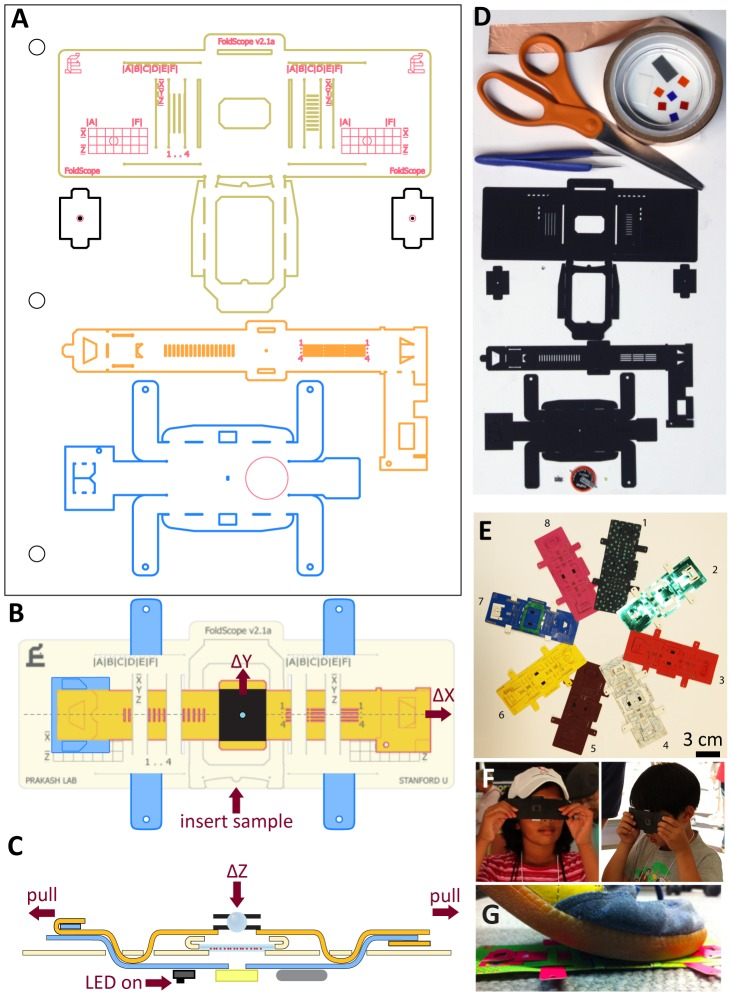
Foldscope design, components and usage.(A) CAD layout of Foldscope paper components on an A4 sheet. (B) Schematic of an assembled Foldscope illustrating panning, and (C) cross-sectional view illustrating flexure-based focusing. (D) Foldscope components and tools used in the assembly, including Foldscope paper components, ball lens, button-cell battery, surface-mounted LED, switch, copper tape and polymeric filters. (E) Different modalities assembled from colored paper stock. (F) Novice users demonstrating the technique for using the Foldscope. (G) Demonstration of the field-rugged design, such as stomping under foot.

A Foldscope is an optical microscope that can be assembled from a punched sheet of cardstock, a spherical glass lens, a light emitting diode (LED) and a diffuser panel, along with a watch battery that powers the LED. Once assembled, the Foldscope is about the size of a bookmark. The Foldscope weighs 8 grams and comes in a kit with a lens that magnifies 140X. The kit also includes magnets that can be stuck onto the Foldscope to attach it to a smartphone, allowing the user to take pictures of the magnification. The magnification power is enough to enable the spotting of organisms such as Leishmania donovani and Escherichia coli, as well as malarial parasites. A Foldscope can be printed on a standard A4 sheet of paper and assembled in seven minutes. Prakash claims that the Foldscope can survive harsh conditions, including being thrown in water or dropped from a five-story building.

Following the first generation of simple Foldscopes, twelve medical diagnostic Foldscope variants are in development with each type being designed specifically to aid in the identification of a particular disease-causing organism. Included with each Foldscope, a picture is provided of the particular microbe to look for on each disease-specific variant. To enable several people to use them at once, each microscope is able to project images with a built-in projector. The Foldscope is designed to be assembled by the end user, and hence is color-coded to help with the assembly. Each unit costs less than one US dollar to build, with estimates varying from 50 cents to 97 cents.

== Uses ==
The Gordon and Betty Moore Foundation funded the "Ten Thousand Microscopes" project under which Prakash plans to give away 10,000 Foldscope kits to interested parties, including students for research. The projects eventually expanded to 50,000 Foldscope kits. Those who received the kits were encouraged to share their experiences using the microscope on a website, Foldscope Explore, so that Prakash's team could see how people could use the Foldscope. Examples of uses submitted by testers include a plant pathologist in Rwanda who used it to examine fungi on banana crops and Maasai children in Tanzania who used it to check cow feces for parasites.

The goal of this project is not only to supply microscopes to those who would not otherwise have access to them but also to advance the general study of biomimicry. By encouraging thousands of volunteers to submit findings about the microorganisms they observe in their local environment, Prakash hopes to find more organisms that could provide clues about how to build new tools that take advantage of these organisms' natural abilities.

In October 2015, India's Department of Biotechnology announced a program to make Foldscopes available across India at 80 approved colleges and programs. It will be used as a teaching tool for students in biology, chemistry and physics. After the pilot program, the department hopes to work with Prakash to develop more low-cost science tools. Foldscope sets will also be produced and tested in Kenya and Uganda.

Although the Foldscope has proven itself useful for a number of tasks, it is not currently adapted to be used as a medical diagnostic tool. When tested for diagnosing schistosomiasis in Ghana, for example, it was impossible to prevent contamination from urine samples because the Foldscope must be brought up to one's face to view. Jim Cybulski, a former graduate student of Prakash, is conducting research about using the Foldscope for diagnostic testing and is helping to develop a medical Foldscope that will cost $10 and have a built-in projector allowing multiple people to view the magnification.

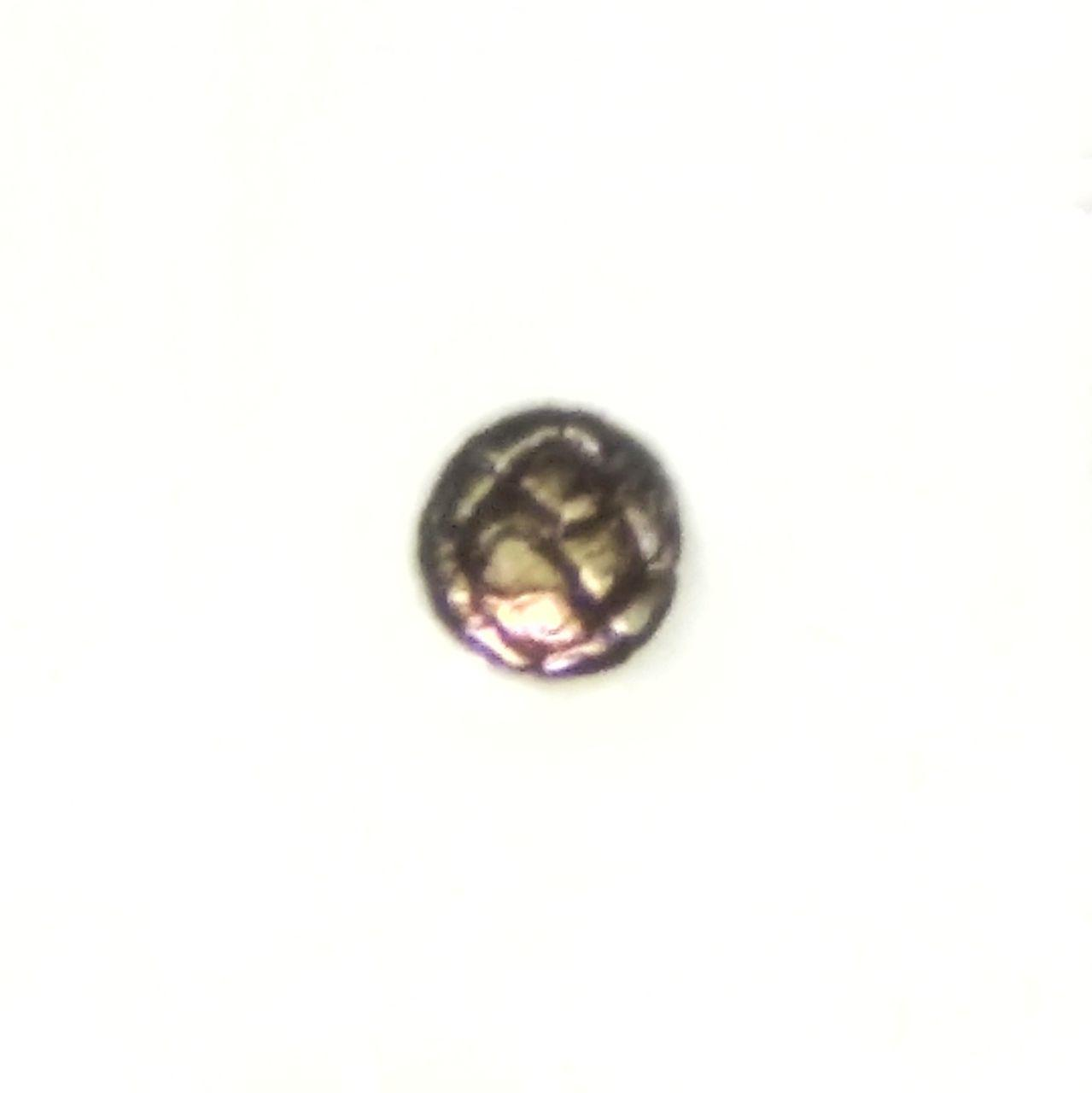
Pollen of Pithecellobium dulce seen with the Foldscope

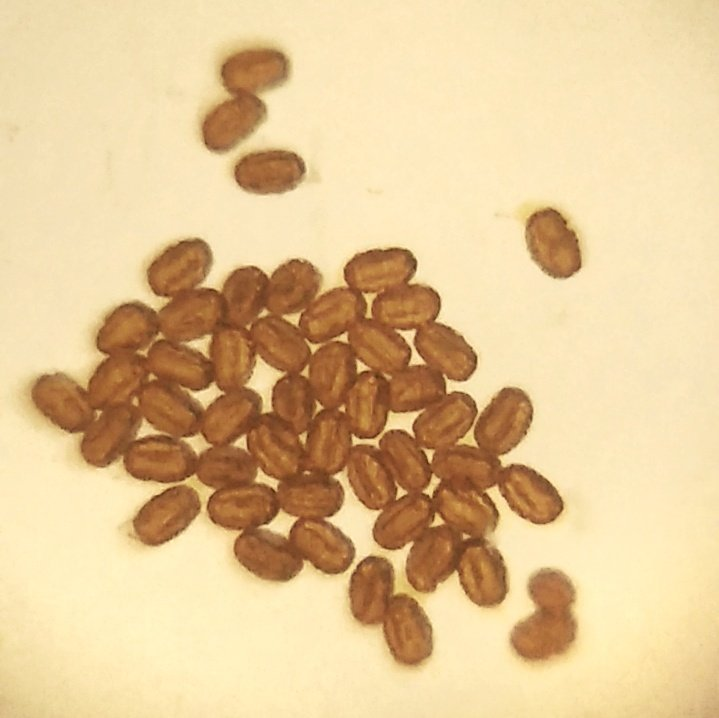
Pollen of Delonix regia seen with the Foldscope

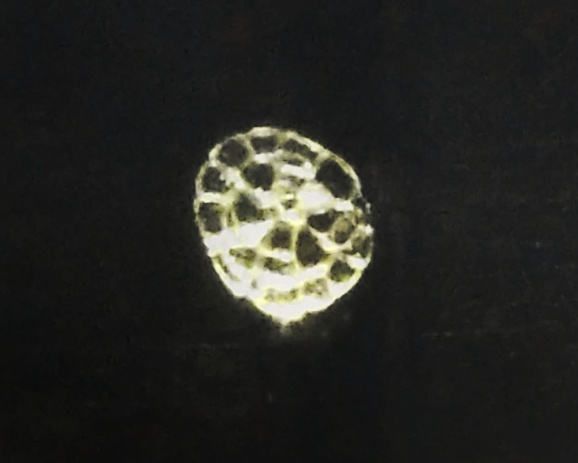
Pollen of Samanea saman seen with the Foldscope

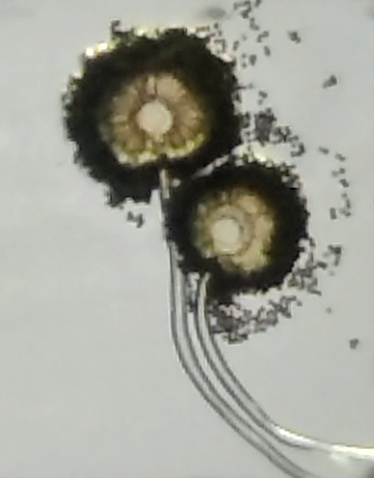
A. niger under the Foldscope

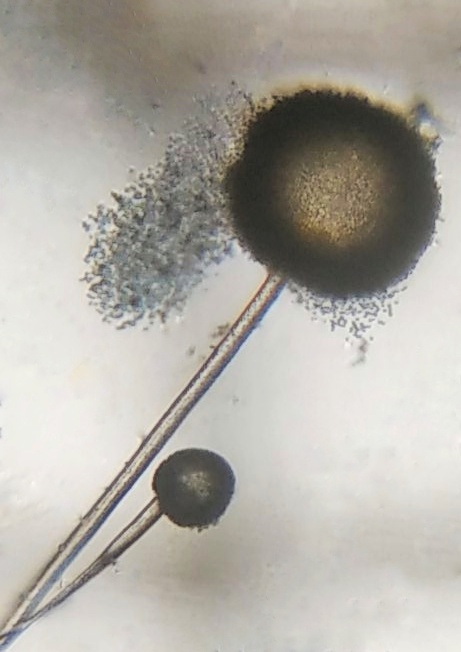
Fungus on garlic cloves seen with the Foldscope

== See also ==
- OpenFlexure Microscope
- Open-source hardware
