= Noel Rose =

American immunologist, pathologist, and molecular microbiologist (1927–2020)

Noel Richard Rose (December 3, 1927 – July 30, 2020), was an American immunologist, pathologist, and molecular microbiologist. He is widely known for pioneering autoimmunity during the 1950s and made several contributions to the field of autoimmunity, which brought in the modern era of research into autoimmune disease. He is often referred to as the "Father of Autoimmunity".

== Early life ==
Rose was born in Stamford, Connecticut, on December 3, 1927. After graduating from Stamford High School, he attended Yale University and graduated with his Bachelor of Science, and then the University of Pennsylvania, where he achieved his Ph.D. He married soon after. It took him ten years to get his M.D. from the University of Buffalo School of Medicine as he was given research funding for his discovery of autoimmunity.

== Career ==
During the 1950s, he experimented with an antigen, called Thyroglobulin, on experimental rabbits and discovered an autoantibody that affected the thyroid gland, this was the first instance of autoimmunity. His research on the genetic basis of autoimmune disease at Wayne State University School of Medicine during the 1970s revealed that the major histocompatibility complex determined the risk of all autoimmune disease. Dr. Rose published over 27 journals, 880 articles, and edited or co-edited 22 books. He was the co-editor of the 6th edition of the textbook The Autoimmune Diseases, former editor of Clinical Immunology and was editor of The Year in Immunology.

While at the University of Buffalo School of Medicine, he worked as a professor of Microbiology and Medicine, director of the Center of Immunology, and director of Clinical Laboratories for twenty years. When he moved to Wayne State University School of Medicine, he served as chairman for the Department of Immunology and Microbiology for ten years. Then, when he joined the faculty of Johns Hopkins University School of Medicine in 1981, he became chairman for the Department of Immunology and Infectious Diseases and later directed the Center for Autoimmune Disease Research. He was also a professor in the Department of Pathology and professor in the W. Henry Feinstone Department of Molecular Microbiology and Immunology. At one point, he served as the chairman of the Autoimmune Disease Coordinating Committee of the National Institutes of Health and principal advisor to the former U.S. NIH Director Dr. Elias A. Zerhouni. In 2015, he retired from Johns Hopkins and was working as a member of the Department of Pathology at Brigham and Women's Hospital.

He died on July 30, 2020, at the age of 92.

== Bibliography ==
- Principles of Immunology (1973)
- Methods in Immunodiagnosis (1973)
- Immune Mediated Heart Disease (1992)
- The Year in Immunology (2013)
- The Autoimmune Diseases 6th Edition (2019)

== Awards and honors ==
- Nobel nominee for being supported for 60 years by the National Institutes of Health.
- 1990 Elected Fellows, American Academy of Microbiology, College of American Pathologists
- 1990 Doctor "Honoris Causa" in Medicine and Surgery from the University of Cagliari, Italy
- 1992 Doctor "Honoris Causa" in Biological Science, University of Sassari, Italy
- 1993 Honorary life-time Member of the Ernest Witebsky Center Committee, State University of New York at Buffalo Abbot Award
- 1994 The American Society for Microbiology ASM Distinguished Medical Alumnus Award, Medical Alumni Association, University at Buffalo School of Medicine
- 1994 Awarded Honorary Membership in the Österreichische Gesellschaft fur Allergologie und Immunologie
- 1997 Universidad Central de Venezuela Honorary Medal, Instituto de Inmunología, Facultad de Medicina, Universidad Central de Venezuela, Caracas, Venezuela
- 1999 Elected Fellow, American Association for the Advancement of Sciences
- 1999 Elected Honorary Member, American Society for Microbiology
- 2003 ASM Professional Recognition Award
- 2004 AESKU Lifetime Achievement Award
- 2005 ASM Founders Medal
- 2006 Lifetime Achievement Award, Keystone Conference, Foreign Member, Polish Academy of Sciences
- 2009 Copernicus Medal
- 2019 Golden Goose Award
