= Heinz Feldmann =

German-American virologist

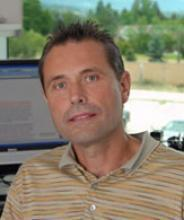
- Education: University of Marburg (MD/PhD)
- Scientific career
- Fields: Virology
- Workplaces: Rocky Mountain Laboratories (NIAID)
- Thesis: Strukturverwandtschaft im Hämagglutinin (Serotyp H 10) bei Influenza-A-Viren von Säugern und Vögeln (1989)

Heinz (Heinrich) Ulrich Feldmann is a German-American virologist who currently serves as the chief of the laboratory of virology at Rocky Mountain Laboratories, NIAID and heads the Disease Modelling and Transmission section. His research focuses on highly pathogenic viruses that require strict biocontainment, including those that cause viral hemorrhagic fever such as Ebola and Lassa. He has been responsible for the development of timely viral countermeasures including the rVSV-ZEBOV vaccine (Ervebro), development of vaccines and drugs against SARS-CoV-2, and epidemiology of SARS-CoV.

== Education ==
Heinz received his MD from the University of Marburg in 1987 and his PhD in 1988. His doctoral thesis focused on the structural relationship between alpha-influenzavirus serotype hemagglutinin 10 in mammals and avians. He conducted joint postdoctoral research at the University of Marburg and the CDC special pathogens branch in Atlanta, Georgia.

== Career ==
From 1999-2008, he served as the chief of the special pathogens branch at the National Microbiology Laboratory at PHAC. In 2008, he began his tenure as the chief of the laboratory of virology at Rocky Mountain Laboratories at NIAID.
