= Influenza A virus subtype H10N7 =

Virus classification
- (unranked): Virus
- Realm: Riboviria
- Kingdom: Orthornavirae
- Phylum: Negarnaviricota
- Class: Insthoviricetes
- Order: Articulavirales
- Family: Orthomyxoviridae
- Genus: Alphainfluenzavirus
- Species: Influenza A virus
- Serotype: Influenza A virus subtype H10N7

Suptype of the Influenza A virus

Influenza A virus subtype H10N7 (A/H10N7) is a subtype of the species Influenza A virus (sometimes called bird flu virus). H10N7 was first reported in humans in Egypt in 2004. It caused illness in two one-year-old infants, and residents of Ismailia, Egypt; one child's father, and a poultry merchant.

The first reported H10N7 outbreak in the US occurred in Minnesota on two turkey farms in 1979 and on a third in 1980. "The clinical signs ranged from severe, with a mortality rate as high as 31%, to subclinical. Antigenically indistinguishable viruses were isolated from healthy mallards on a pond adjacent to the turkey farms".

The Influenza A (H10N7) virus was also held responsible for an increased mortality of harbour seals (Phoca vitulina) in Europe in 2014. First cases were reported in spring 2014 in Sweden and subsequently spread to Denmark. Within a few months the virus spread to the Wadden Sea area of Germany and the Netherlands causing the death of about 10% of the local harbour seal population.
