= Gesellschaft für Virologie =

Specialist academic society for virology

- Formation: July 9, 1990
- Legal status: Registered association
- Headquarters: Erlangen
- Members: approx. 1300
- Chair: Ulf Dittmer
- Website: g-f-v.org

The Gesellschaft für Virologie eV (GfV; Society for Virology) is a specialist society for all virological specialist areas in Germany, Austria and Switzerland, based in Erlangen in Germany.

The GfV is a member of the AWMF, an umbrella organisation of more than 150 German medical societies, and the DNB.

It was founded in 1990 after leading virologists no longer saw their interests and the tasks of the subject of virology represented in the German Society for Hygiene and Microbiology (DGHM). The focus was originally on basic virological research, virus genetics and molecular virology; later it also represented medical virology, virological infectiology, immunology and plant virology on an equal footing at annual conferences. It is now the largest virological specialist society in Europe.
