= Rocky Mountain Laboratories =

Biomedical research lab in Hamilton, Montana

Coordinates: 46.23737°N 114.15985°W

Agency overview
- Formed: 1928
- Preceding agency: Hygienic Laboratory
- Headquarters: Hamilton, Montana
- Employees: 400
- Parent agency: National Institute of Allergy and Infectious Disease, National Institutes of Health, United States Department of Health & Human Services

Rocky Mountain Laboratories (RML) is part of the NIH Intramural Research Program and is located in Hamilton, Montana. Operated by the National Institute of Allergy and Infectious Diseases, RML conducts research on maximum containment pathogens such as Ebola as well as research on prions and intracellular pathogens such as Coxiella burnetii and Francisella tularensis. RML operates one of the few Biosafety level 4 laboratories in the United States, as well as Biosafety level 3 and ABSL3/4 laboratories.

== History ==
RML evolved as a result of research on Rocky Mountain spotted fever that began around 1900, in the Bitterroot Valley. A deadly disease of unknown origin plagued early settlers of the valley. It was known locally as "black measles" because of its severe, dark rash. Montana researchers were working in the area in makeshift cabins and tents. In 1909, Dr. Howard Taylor Ricketts, while working in the area, isolated Rickettsia rickettsii as the Gram-negative bacterium that causes Rocky Mountain spotted fever.

RML formally began as the Montana Board of Entomology Laboratory. It was opened in 1928 by the Montana State Board of Entomology to study Rocky Mountain spotted fever and the ticks, Dermacentor andersoni, that carry it. Local opposition to the "tick lab" was strong, as residents worried ticks would escape the laboratory and cause an outbreak in the community. To allay their fears, the original laboratory building featured a small moat around its perimeter. In 1932, after spotted fever was diagnosed in other states, the federal government bought the facility and renamed it Rocky Mountain Laboratory. The laboratory expanded, adding faculty to study zoonotic diseases including typhus, tularemia, and Q-fever. H. R. Cox and Gordon Davis working at RML discovered that Coxiella burnetii was the causative agent of Q fever.

During World War II, the United States Public Health Service used the laboratory to manufacture Yellow fever vaccine. When the human serum–base vaccine caused an outbreak of Hepatitis B that infected more than 350,000 U.S. soldiers, two researchers at the laboratory, Dr. Mason Hargett and Harry Burruss, developed an aqueous-base vaccine that combined distilled water with virus grown in chicken eggs. By the end of the war, the laboratory distributed more than 1 million doses of the improved yellow fever vaccine.

In the post-war decades, the laboratory broadened its scope to study chlamydia trachomatis and transmissible spongiform encephalopathies including scrapie, mad cow disease, and chronic wasting disease. In 1982, Dr. Willy Burgdorfer discovered Borrelia burgdorferi, the tick-borne bacterium that causes Lyme disease.

== Post 9/11 and BSL-4 Facility ==
In the aftermath of September 11 attacks, Dr. Anthony Fauci and others advised President George W. Bush on a national bio-defense program with one element of that program being the construction of a state-of-the-art BSL-4 facility at RML, since the Bethesda campus of NIAID did not have the necessary real estate to build a facility and because of RML's 100-year history of studying zoonotic infectious diseases. The Integrated Research Facility opened in 2008 and has enabled research on emergent tick and mosquito-borne flaviviruses in North America and includes a cryo-electron microscopy facility for the structural study of emergent pathogens.

Around 2009, Heinz Feldmann and Vincent Munster relocated to RML. In 2011, RML published its first transmissible vaccine paper for "disseminating" an Ebola vaccine to prevent Ebola transmission in wildlife populations. In 2018, RML won two DARPA projects for transmissible animal vaccines.

== Contributions to Understanding SARS-CoV-2 ==
Dr. Vincent Munster and Dr. Michael Letko, beginning in 2016, built new tools to study the mechanisms of cell entry of betacoronaviruses that include MERS-CoV and SARS-CoV. In 2020, Munster's lab used this technology to characterize the receptor preference and cell entry of the entire sarbecoronavirus subgenus and were rapidly able to determine that SARS-CoV-2 uses the ACE2 protein as a receptor to enter human cells. In February 2020, some of the first electron micrographs of SARS-CoV-2 were collected at RML.
