= Pyrazofurin =

Chemical compound

Clinical data
- Trade names: Pyrazofurin

Legal status
- Legal status: US: Investigational New Drug

Identifiers
- IUPAC name: 3-[(2S,3R,4S,5R)-3,4-Dihydroxy-5-(hydroxymethyl)oxolan-2-yl]-4-hydroxy-1H-pyrazole-5-carboxamide
- CAS Number: 30868-30-5
- PubChem CID: 135413551
- ChemSpider: 10570780
- UNII: 4B15044GQZ
- KEGG: D05658
- ChEBI: CHEBI:90284
- ChEMBL: ChEMBL2105330

Chemical and physical data
- Formula: C_{9}H_{13}N_{3}O_{6}
- Molar mass: 259.218 g·mol^{−1}
- 3D model (JSmol): Interactive image
- SMILES: C([C@@H]1[C@H]([C@H]([C@@H](O1)C2=NNC(=C2O)C(=O)N)O)O)O
- InChI: InChI=1S/C9H13N3O6/c10-9(17)4-6(15)3(11-12-4)8-7(16)5(14)2(1-13)18-8/h2,5,7-8,13-16H,1H2,(H2,10,17)(H,11,12)/t2-,5-,7-,8+/m1/s1; Key:XESARGFCSKSFID-FLLFQEBCSA-N

Pyrazofurin (pyrazomycin) is a natural product found in Streptomyces candidus, which is a nucleoside analogue related to ribavirin. It has antibiotic, antiviral and anti-cancer properties but was not successful in human clinical trials due to severe side effects. Nevertheless, it continues to be the subject of ongoing research as a potential drug of last resort, or a template for improved synthetic derivatives.

== See also ==
- Acadesine
- EICAR (antiviral)
- Sangivamycin
