= Sangivamycin =

Chemical compound

Identifiers
- IUPAC name: 4-amino-7-[(2R,3R,4S,5R)-3,4-dihydroxy-5-(hydroxymethyl)oxolan-2-yl]pyrrolo[2,3-d]pyrimidine-5-carboxamide
- CAS Number: 18417-89-5
- PubChem CID: 14978
- ChemSpider: 14261
- UNII: L8YQ8Z3T9T
- ChEBI: CHEBI:85997
- ChEMBL: ChEMBL101892
- ECHA InfoCard: 100.162.068

Chemical and physical data
- Formula: C_{12}H_{15}N_{5}O_{5}
- Molar mass: 309.282 g·mol^{−1}
- 3D model (JSmol): Interactive image
- SMILES: C1=C(C2=C(N=CN=C2N1[C@H]3[C@@H]([C@@H]([C@H](O3)CO)O)O)N)C(=O)N
- InChI: InChI=1S/C12H15N5O5/c13-9-6-4(10(14)21)1-17(11(6)16-3-15-9)12-8(20)7(19)5(2-18)22-12/h1,3,5,7-8,12,18-20H,2H2,(H2,14,21)(H2,13,15,16)/t5-,7-,8-,12-/m1/s1; Key:OBZJZDHRXBKKTJ-JTFADIMSSA-N

Sangivamycin is a natural product originally isolated from Streptomyces rimosus, which is a nucleoside analogue. It acts as an inhibitor of protein kinase C. It has antibiotic, antiviral and anti-cancer properties and has been investigated for various medical applications, though never approved for clinical use itself. However, a number of related derivatives continue to be researched.

Oyagen, a biotechnology company, has been developing sangivamycin or OYA1, which showed efficacy against Ebola infections, as a broad spectrum antiviral for COVID-19. Tonix Pharmaceuticals licensed OYA1 from Oyagen in April 2021 to develop it for the treatment of COVID-19 and it is now called TNX-3500. In July 2022, Tonix announced that it was terminating development of TNX-3500, an antiviral inhibitor of SARS-CoV-2, and the associated licence agreement with OyaGen, Inc. was expected to be terminated, effective September 20, 2022.

== See also ==
- CMX521 (methylated analogue)
- GS-441524
- NITD008
- Pyrazofurin
