= Mexican Hairless =

Mexican Hairless may refer to:

- Mexican Hairless Dog, a rare, almost hairless variant of the Xoloitzcuintle dog
- Mexican Hairless Cat, an extinct and unrecognized breed
- "Mexican Hairless", a song by Toadies from their 1994 album Rubberneck
