= C11H13N3O5 =

The molecular formula C_{11}H_{13}N_{3}O_{5} may refer to:

- EICAR (antiviral)
- Propenidazole
