= Timeline of the COVID-19 pandemic in 2023 =

Chronology and epidemiology of SARS-CoV-2

This article documents the chronology and epidemiology of the COVID-19 pandemic, involving coronavirus disease 2019 (COVID-19) caused by SARS-CoV-2, in 2023.

The WHO ended the public health emergency of international concern (PHEIC) on 5 May 2023. COVID-19 is expected to circulate indefinitely, but as of 2024, experts were uncertain as to whether it was still a pandemic or had become endemic. Pandemics and their ends are not well-defined, and whether or not one has ended differs according to the definition used.

== Pandemic chronology ==
=== January ===
==== 1 January ====
- Malaysia has reported 420 new cases, bringing the total number to 5,027,097. There are 547 recoveries, bringing the total number of recoveries to 4,978,369. There are four deaths, bringing the death toll to 7,854.
- Singapore has reported 542 new cases, bringing the total number to 2,202,756.

==== 2 January ====
- Malaysia has reported 360 new cases, bringing the total number to 5,027,457. There are 423 recoveries, bringing the total number of recoveries to 4,978,792. One death was reported, bringing the death toll to 36,858.
- Singapore has reported 390 new cases, bringing the total number to 2,203,146. One new death was reported, bringing the death toll to 1,712.

==== 3 January ====
- Malaysia has reported 333 new cases, bringing the total number to 5,027,790. There are 376 recoveries, bringing the total number of recoveries to 4,979,168. One death was reported, bringing the death toll to 36,859.
- Singapore has reported 556 new cases, bringing the total number to 2,203,702.
- South Korean singer Dahyun of Twice has tested positive for COVID-19.

==== 4 January ====
WHO Weekly Report:

- Malaysia has reported 433 new cases, bringing the total number to 5,028,223. There are 500 recoveries, bringing the total number of recoveries to 4,979,668. The death toll remains 36,859.
- New Zealand has reported 22,770 new cases over the past week, bringing the total number to 2,117,094. There are 31,968 recoveries, bringing the total number of recoveries to 2,092,041. The death toll remains 2,331.
- Singapore has reported 1,535 new cases, bringing the total number to 2,205,237.
- Australian cricketer Matt Renshaw has tested positive for COVID-19.

==== 5 January ====
- Malaysia has reported 571 new cases, bringing the total number to 5,028,794. There are 696 recoveries, bringing the total number of recoveries to 4,980,364. There are seven deaths, bringing the death toll to 36,866.
- Singapore has reported 916 new cases, bringing the total number to 2,206,153.

==== 6 January ====
- Japan has reported 245,542 new daily cases, surpassing 30 million relative cases, bringing the total number to 30,044,377.
- Malaysia has reported 543 new cases, bringing the total number to 5,029,337. There are 688 recoveries, bringing the total number of recoveries to 4,981,052. There are four deaths, bringing the death toll to 36,870.
- Singapore has reported 833 new cases, bringing the total number to 2,206,986.
- Taiwan has reported 27,676 new cases, surpassing 9 million relative cases, bringing the total number to 9,007,371. 62 new deaths were reported, bringing the death toll to 15,445.
- The United States of America surpasses 103 million cases.

==== 7 January ====
- Malaysia has reported 571 new cases, bringing the total number to 5,029,908. There are 551 recoveries, bringing the total number of recoveries to 4,981,603. Four deaths were reported, bringing the death toll to 36,874.
- Singapore has reported 684 new cases, bringing the total number to 2,207,670.

==== 8 January ====
- Malaysia has reported 405 new cases, bringing the total number to 5,030,313. There are 441 recoveries, bringing the total number of recoveries to 4,982,044. One death was reported, bringing the death toll to 36,875.
- Singapore has reported 546 new cases, bringing the total number to 2,208,216. One new death was reported, bringing the death toll to 1,713.

==== 9 January ====
- Malaysia has reported 383 new cases, bringing the total number to 5,030,696. There are 355 recoveries, bringing the total number of recoveries to 4,982,399. There are eight deaths, bringing the death toll to 36,883.
- New Zealand has reported 21,685 new cases, bringing the total number to 2,138,754. There are 22,677 recoveries, bringing the total number of recoveries to 2,114,718. There are 62 deaths, bringing the death toll to 2,393.
- Singapore has reported 385 new cases, bringing the total number to 2,208,601. One new death was reported, bringing the death toll to 1,714.
- Taiwan has reported 17,318 new cases, bringing the total number to 9,072,505. 40 new deaths were reported, bringing the death toll to 15,582.
- Today marks three years since the first death of the whole pandemic occurred in Wuhan, China.

==== 10 January ====
- Argentina surpasses 10 million COVID-19 cases.
- Malaysia has reported 380 new cases, bringing the total number to 5,031,076. There are 373 recoveries, bringing the total number of recoveries to 4,982,772. There are nine deaths, bringing the death toll to 36,892.
- Singapore has reported 910 new cases, bringing the total number to 2,209,511.
- Kansas governor Laura Kelly has tested positive for COVID-19.

==== 11 January ====
WHO Weekly Report:

- Malaysia has reported 367 new cases, bringing the total number to 5,031,443. There are 398 recoveries, bringing the total number of recoveries to 4,983,170. There are nine deaths, bringing the death toll to 36,901.
- Singapore has reported 598 new cases, bringing the total number to 2,210,109. Three new deaths were reported, bringing the death toll to 1,717.

==== 12 January ====
- Japan has reported 185,472 new daily cases, surpassing 31 million relative cases, bringing the total number to 31,032,204.
- Malaysia has reported 383 new cases, bringing the total number to 5,031,826. There are 625 recoveries, bringing the total number of recoveries to 4,983,795. There are four deaths, bringing the death toll to 36,905.
- Singapore has reported 524 new cases, bringing the total number to 2,210,633.

==== 13 January ====
- Malaysia has reported 320 new cases, bringing the total number to 5,032,146. There are 506 recoveries, bringing the total number of recoveries to 4,984,301. There are three deaths, bringing the death toll to 36,908.
- Singapore has reported 498 new cases, bringing the total number to 2,211,131.
- Taiwan has reported 21,737 new cases, bringing the total number to 9,167,811. 53 new deaths were reported, bringing the death toll to 15,755.

==== 14 January ====
- China has reported that 59,938 COVID-related deaths occurred between 8 December 2022 and 12 January 2022.
- Malaysia has reported 287 new cases, bringing the total number of 5,032,433. There are 590 recoveries, bringing the total number of recoveries to 4,984,891. The death toll remains 36,908.
- Singapore has reported 415 new cases, bringing the total number to 2,211,546.

==== 15 January ====
- Malaysia has reported 244 new cases, bringing the total number to 5,032,677. There are 401 recoveries, bringing the total number of recoveries to 4,985,292. The death toll remains 36,908.
- Singapore has reported 309 new cases, bringing the total number to 2,211,855.

==== 16 January ====
- The Cook Islands reported its second death. The territory has reported a total of 6,952 cases so far.
- Malaysia has reported 227 new cases, bringing the total number to 5,032,904. There are 367 recoveries, bringing the total number of recoveries to 4,985,659. There are six deaths, bringing the death toll to 36,914.
- New Zealand has reported 19,215 new cases over the past week, bringing the total number to 2,157,933. There are 21,615 recoveries, bringing the total number of recoveries to 2,136,333. There are 44 deaths, bringing the death toll to 2,437.
- Singapore has reported 276 new cases, bringing the total number to 2,212,131.

==== 17 January ====
- Malaysia has reported 350 new cases, bringing the total number to 5,033,254. There are 349 recoveries, bringing the total number of recoveries to 4,986,008. There are five deaths, bringing the death toll to 36,919.
- Singapore has reported 553 new cases, bringing the total number to 2,212,684.
- Taiwan has reported 19,970 new cases, bringing the total number to 9,245,066. 40 new deaths were reported, bringing the death toll to 15,903.

==== 18 January ====
- Malaysia has reported 371 new cases, bringing the total number to 5,033,625. There are 304 recoveries, bringing the total number of recoveries to 4,986,312. There are four deaths, bringing the death toll to 36,923.
- Singapore has reported 407 new cases, bringing the total number to 2,213,091. One new death was reported, bringing the death toll to 1,718.
- Federal Reserve Chairman Jerome Powell has tested positive for COVID-19.

==== 19 January ====
WHO Weekly Report:

- Malaysia has reported 318 new cases, bringing the total number to 5,033,943. There are 331 recoveries, bringing the total number of recoveries to 4,986,643. The death toll remains 36,923.
- Singapore has reported 344 new cases, bringing the total number to 2,213,435. One new death was reported, bringing the death toll to 1,719.

==== 20 January ====
- Malaysia has 285 new cases, bringing the total number to 5,034,228. There are 300 recoveries, bringing the total number of recoveries to 4,986,943. There are seven deaths, bringing the death toll to 36,930.
- Singapore has reported 360 new cases, bringing the total number to 2,213,795. One new death was reported, bringing the death toll to 1,720.
- Taiwan has reported 18,218 new cases, bringing the total number to 9,302,697. 61 new deaths were reported, bringing the death toll to 16,038.

==== 21 January ====
- Malaysia has reported 293 new cases, bringing the total number to 5,034,521. There are 326 recoveries, bringing the total number of recoveries to 4,987,269. There are two deaths, bringing the death toll to 36,932.
- Singapore has reported 269 new cases, bringing the total number to 2,214,064.

==== 22 January ====
- Japan has reported 64,450 new daily cases, surpassing 32 million relative cases, bringing the total number to 32,045,328.
- Malaysia has reported 309 new cases, bringing the total number to 5,034,830. There are 292 recoveries, bringing the total number of recoveries to 4,987,561. The death toll remains 36,932.
- Singapore has reported 170 new cases, bringing the total number to 2,214,234.

==== 23 January ====
- Malaysia has reported 142 new cases, bringing the total number to 5,034,972. 267 recoveries were reported, bringing the total number of recoveries to 4,987,828. The death toll remains 36,932.
- New Zealand has reported 13,880 new cases, bringing the total number to 2,171,788. There are 19,138 recoveries, bringing the total number of recoveries to 2,155,471. There are 31 deaths, bringing the death toll to 2,468.
- Singapore has reported 78 new cases, bringing the total number to 2,214,312.
- South Korea has reported 9,227 new cases, surpassing 30 million relative cases, bringing the total number to 30,008,756.
- Taiwan has reported 10,669 new cases, bringing the total number to 9,353,625. 24 new deaths were reported, bringing the death toll to 16,122.

==== 24 January ====
- Malaysia has reported 101 new cases, bringing the total number to 5,035,073. There are 315 recoveries, bringing the total number of recoveries to 4,988,143. The death toll remains 36,932.
- Singapore has reported 125 new cases, bringing the total number to 2,214,437.

==== 25 January ====
WHO Weekly Report:

- Malaysia has reported 132 new cases, bringing the total number to 5,035,205. There are 346 recoveries, bringing the total number of recoveries to 4,988,489. One death was reported, bringing the death toll to 36,933.
- Singapore has reported 164 new cases, bringing the total number to 2,214,601.
- Taiwan has reported 16,518 new cases, bringing the total number to 9,384,996. 22 new deaths were reported, bringing the death toll to 16,168.
- The United States of America surpasses 104 million cases.

==== 26 January ====
- Malaysia has reported 172 new cases, bringing the total number to 5,035,377. There are 325 recoveries, bringing the total number of recoveries to 4,988,814. There are three deaths, bringing the death toll to 36,936.
- Singapore has reported 508 new cases, bringing the total number to 2,215,109.
- Taiwan has reported 19,144 new cases, bringing the total number to 9,404,138. 21 new deaths were reported, bringing the death toll to 16,189.

==== 27 January ====
- Malaysia has reported 236 new cases, bringing the total number to 5,035,613. There are 312 recoveries, bringing the total number of recoveries to 4,989,126. There are two deaths, bringing the death toll to 36,938.
- Singapore has reported 418 new cases, bringing the total number to 2,215,527.
- Taiwan has reported 24,350 new cases, bringing the total number to 9,428,486. 15 new deaths were reported, bringing the death toll to 16,204.

==== 28 January ====
- Malaysia has reported 258 new cases, bringing the total number to 5,035,871. There are 309 recoveries, bringing the total number of recoveries to 4,989,435. There are two deaths, bringing the death toll to 36,490.
- Singapore has reported 362 new cases, bringing the total number to 2,215,889.
- Delaware governor John Carney has tested positive for COVID-19.

==== 29 January ====
- Malaysia has reported 269 new cases, bringing the total number to 5,036,140. There are 285 recoveries, bringing the total number of recoveries to 4,989,720. The death toll remains 36,940.
- Singapore has reported 296 new cases, bringing the total number to 2,216,185. One new death was reported, bringing the death toll to 1,721.
- Taiwan has reported 27,350 new cases, bringing the total number to 9,483,267. 22 new deaths were reported, bringing the death toll to 16,246.

==== 30 January ====
- Malaysia has reported 202 new cases, bringing the total number to 5,036,342. There are 141 recoveries, bringing the total number of recoveries to 4,989,861. There are two deaths, bringing the death toll to 36,942.
- New Zealand has reported 10,589 new cases, bringing the total number to 2,182,355. There are 13,849 recoveries, bringing the total number of recoveries to 2,169,320. There are nine deaths, bringing the death toll to 2,477.
- Singapore has reported 273 new cases, bringing the total number to 2,216,458. One new death was reported, bringing the death toll to 1,722.
- Taiwan has reported 22,291 new cases, bringing the total number to 9,505,551. 30 new deaths were reported, bringing the death toll to 16,276.
- Today marks three years since the World Health Organization declared a public health emergency of international concern.

==== 31 January ====
- Malaysia has reported 251 new cases, bringing the total number to 5,036,593. The number of recoveries remain 4,989,861 while the death toll remains 36,942.
- Singapore has reported 652 new cases, bringing the total number to 2,217,110.
- Taiwan has reported 32,287 new cases, bringing the total number to 9,537,823. 32 new deaths were reported, bringing the death toll to 16,308.

=== February ===
==== 1 February ====
WHO Weekly Report:

- Malaysia has reported 325 new cases, bringing the total number to 5,036,918. There are 113 recoveries, bringing the total number of recoveries to 4,990,079. The death toll remains 36,942.
- Singapore has reported 465 new cases, bringing the total number to 2,217,575.
- Taiwan has reported 31,801 new cases, bringing the total number to 9,569,611. 48 new deaths were reported, bringing the death toll to 16,356.
- Washington governor Jay Inslee has tested positive for COVID-19 for the second time.

==== 2 February ====
- Malaysia has reported 324 new cases, bringing the total number to 5,037,242. There are 148 recoveries, bringing the total number of recoveries to 4,990,227. The death toll remains 36,942.
- Singapore has reported 475 new cases, bringing the total number to 2,218,050.
- Taiwan has reported 27,085 new cases, bringing the total number to 9,596,660. 74 new deaths were reported, bringing the death toll to 16,430.

==== 3 February ====
- Malaysia has reported 340 new cases, bringing the total number to 5,037,582. There are 203 recoveries, bringing the total number of recoveries to 4,990,430. The death toll remains 36,942.
- Singapore has reported 458 new cases, bringing the total number to 2,218,508.
- Taiwan has reported 25,477 new cases, bringing the total number to 9,622,129. The country reported the most deaths at 105, since the first of the pandemic, bringing the death toll to 16,535.

==== 4 February ====
- Malaysia has reported 202 new cases, bringing the total number to 5,037,784. There are 275 recoveries, bringing the total number of recoveries to 4,990,705. One death was reported, bringing the death toll to 36,943.
- Singapore has reported 373 new cases, bringing the total number to 2,218,881.
- Taiwan has reported 23,746 new cases, bringing the total number to 9,645,862. 79 new deaths were reported, bringing the death toll to 16,614.
- Austin Mayor Kirk Watson has tested positive for COVID-19.

==== 5 February ====
- Malaysia has reported 211 new cases, bringing the total number to 5,037,995. There are 272 recoveries, bringing the total number of recoveries to 4,990,977. The death toll remains 36,943.
- Singapore has reported 299 new cases, bringing the total number to 2,219,180.
- Taiwan has reported 22,991 new cases, bringing the total number to 9,668,845. 73 new deaths were reported, bringing the death toll to 16,687.

==== 6 February ====
- Malaysia has reported 175 new cases, bringing the total number to 5,038,170. There are 196 recoveries, bringing the total number of recoveries to 4,991,173. One death was reported, bringing the death toll to 36,944.
- Russia surpasses 22 million COVID-19 cases.
- Singapore has reported 251 new cases, bringing the total number to 2,219,431.
- Taiwan has reported 16,640 new cases, bringing the total number to 9,685,484. 63 new deaths were reported, bringing the death toll to 16,750.

==== 7 February ====
- Malaysia has reported 184 new cases, bringing the total number to 5,038,354. There are 253 recoveries, bringing the total number of recoveries to 4,991,426. There are two deaths, bringing the death toll to 36,946.
- New Zealand has reported 8,882 new cases over the past week, bringing the total number to 2,191,215. There are 10,556 recoveries, bringing the total number of recoveries to 2,179,876. There are 25 deaths, bringing the death toll to 2,502.
- Singapore has reported 631 new cases, bringing the total number to 2,220,062.
- Taiwan has reported 23,394 new cases, bringing the total number to 9,708,863. 45 new deaths were reported, bringing the death toll to 16,795.

==== 8 February ====
WHO Weekly Report:

- Japan has reported 41,584 new daily cases, bringing the total number to 32,846,656. There are 200 deaths, bringing the death toll to 69,962.
- Malaysia has reported 189 new cases, bringing the total number to 5,038,543. There are 279 recoveries, bringing the total number of recoveries to 4,991,705. The death toll remains 36,946.
- Singapore has reported 472 new cases, bringing the total number to 2,220,534.
- Taiwan has reported 24,240 new cases, bringing the total number to 9,733,094. 54 new deaths were reported, bringing the death toll to 16,849.

==== 9 February ====
- Malaysia has reported 269 new cases, bringing the total number to 5,038,812. There are 375 recoveries, bringing the total number of recoveries to 4,992,080. The death toll remains 36,946.
- Singapore has reported 465 new cases, bringing the total number to 2,220,999.
- Taiwan has reported 20,920 new cases, bringing the total number to 9,754,006. 54 new deaths were reported, bringing the death toll to 16,894.

==== 10 February ====
- Malaysia has reported 255 new cases, bringing the total number to 5,039,067. There are 306 recoveries, bringing the total number of recoveries to 4,992,386. There are four deaths, bringing the death toll to 36,950.
- Singapore has reported 439 new cases, bringing the total number to 2,221,438.
- Taiwan has reported 19,629 new cases, bringing the total number to 9,773,627. 70 new deaths were reported, bringing the death toll to 16,964.

==== 11 February ====
- Malaysia has reported 259 new cases, bringing the total number to 5,039,326. There are 390 recoveries, bringing the total number of recoveries to 4,992,776. One death was reported, bringing the death toll to 36,951.
- Singapore has reported 324 new cases, bringing the total number to 2,221,762.
- Taiwan has reported 18,300 new cases, bringing the total number to 9,791,908. 82 new deaths were reported, bringing the death toll to 17,046.

==== 12 February ====
- Malaysia has reported 160 new cases, bringing the total number to 5,039,486. There are 358 recoveries, bringing the total number of recoveries to 4,993,134. The death toll remains 36,951.
- Singapore has reported 244 new cases, bringing the total number to 2,222,006.
- Taiwan has reported 17,199 new cases, bringing the total number to 9,809,098. 57 new deaths were reported, bringing the death toll to 17,103.
- Global recoveries around the world have exceeded 650 million.

==== 13 February ====
- Malaysia has reported 164 new cases, bringing the total number to 5,039,650. There are 254 recoveries, bringing the total number of recoveries to 4,993,388. One death was reported, bringing the death toll to 36,952.
- New Zealand has reported 8,396 new cases over the past week, bringing the total number to 2,199,579. There are 9,155 recoveries, bringing the total number of recoveries to 2,189,301. There are 11 deaths, bringing the death toll to 2,513.
- Taiwan has reported 12,657 new cases, bringing the total number to 9,821,755. 54 new deaths were reported, bringing the death toll to 17,157.
- Queen Camilla, wife of King Charles III, has tested positive for COVID-19 for the second time and has to postpone several public events.

==== 14 February ====
- Malaysia has reported 200 new cases, bringing the total number to 5,039,850. There are 155 recoveries, bringing the total number of recoveries to 4,993,543. One death was reported, bringing the death toll to 36,953.
- Taiwan has reported 20,511 new cases, bringing the total number to 9,842,257. 36 new deaths were reported, bringing the death toll to 17,193.

==== 15 February ====
WHO Weekly Report:

- Japan has reported 28,772 new daily cases, surpassing 33 million relative cases, bringing the total number to 33,019,616. There are 213 deaths, bringing the death toll to 71,136.
- Malaysia has reported 237 new cases, bringing the total number to 5,040,087. There are 215 recoveries, bringing the total number of recoveries to 4,993,758. One death was reported, bringing the death toll to 36,954.
- South Korea has reported 14,957 new cases, bringing the total number to 30,384,701. There are 24 deaths, bringing the death toll to 33,782.
- Taiwan has reported 19,861 new cases, bringing the total number to 9,862,108. 65 new deaths were reported, bringing the death toll to 17,258.

==== 16 February ====
- Malaysia has reported 281 new cases, bringing the total number to 5,040,368. There are 257 recoveries, bringing the total number of recoverites to 4,994,015. The death toll remains 36,954.
- Taiwan has reported 16,747 new cases, bringing the total number to 9,878,848. 61 new deaths were reported, bringing the death toll to 17,319.

==== 17 February ====
- Germany surpasses 38 million COVID-19 cases.
- Canada has reported 826 new cases and six new deaths.
- Malaysia has reported 241 new cases, bringing the total number to 5,040,609. There are 235 recoveries, bringing the total number of recoveries to 4,994,250. The death toll remains 36,954.
- Taiwan has reported 15,440 new cases, bringing the total number to 9,894,283. 78 new deaths were reported, bringing the death toll to 17,397.

==== 18 February ====
- Malaysia has reported 212 new cases, bringing the total number to 5,040,821. There are 310 recoveries, bringing the total number of recoveries to 4,994,560. One death was reported, bringing the death toll to 36,955.
- Taiwan has reported 15,094 new cases, bringing the total number to 9,909,368. 55 new deaths were reported, bringing the death toll to 17,452.

==== 19 February ====
- Malaysia has reported 186 new cases, bringing the total number to 5,041,007. There are 158 recoveries, bringing the total number of recoveries to 4,994,718. One death was reported, bringing the death toll to 36,956.
- Taiwan has reported 15,877 new cases, bringing the total number to 9,925,158. 68 new deaths were reported, bringing the death toll to 17,520.

==== 20 February ====
- Malaysia has reported 167 new cases, bringing the total number to 5,041,174. There are 169 recoveries, bringing the total number of recoveries to 4,994,888. One death was reported, bringing the death toll to 36,957.
- New Zealand has reported 8,220 new cases in the past week, bringing the total number to 2,207,775. There are 8,092 recoveries, bringing the total number of recoveries to 2,197,123. 21 deaths were reported, bringing the death toll to 2,534.
- Taiwan has reported 12,060 new cases, bringing the total number to 9,937,216. 44 new deaths were reported, bringing the death toll to 17,564.

==== 21 February ====
- Malaysia has reported 184 new cases, bringing the total number to 5,041,358. There are 192 recoveries, bringing the total number of recoveries to 4,995,079. The death toll remains 36,957.
- Taiwan has reported 17,253 new cases, bringing the total number to 9,954,456. 44 new deaths were reported, bringing the death toll to 17,608.
- The United States of America surpasses 105 million cases.

==== 22 February ====
WHO Weekly Report:

- Malaysia has reported 229 new cases, bringing the total number to 5,041,587. There are 227 recoveries, bringing the death toll to 4,995,306. The death toll remains 36,957.
- Taiwan has reported 16,484 new cases, bringing the total number to 9,970,937. 64 new deaths were reported, bringing the death toll to 17,672.

==== 23 February ====
- Brazil surpasses 37 million COVID-19 cases.
- Malaysia has reported 224 new cases, bringing the total number to 5,041,811. There are 278 recoveries, bringing the total number of recoveries to 4,995,584. The death toll remains 36,957.
- Taiwan has reported 14,387 new cases, bringing the total number to 9,985,320. 37 new deaths were reported, bringing the death toll to 17,709.

==== 24 February ====
- Malaysia has reported 204 new cases, bringing the total number to 5,042,015. There are 254 recoveries, bringing the total number of recoveries to 4,995,838. The death toll remains 36,957.
- Taiwan has reported 13,440 new cases, bringing the total number to 9,998,752. 56 new deaths were reported, bringing the death toll to 17,765.

==== 25 February ====
- Malaysia has reported 173 new cases, bringing the total number to 5,042,188. There are 219 recoveries, bringing the total number of recoveries to 4,996,057. The death toll remains 36,957.
- Taiwan has reported 13,526 new cases, surpassing 10 million relative cases, bringing the total number to 10,012,276. 53 new deaths were reported, bringing the death toll to 17,818.

==== 26 February ====
- Malaysia has reported 207 new cases, bringing the total number to 5,042,395. There are 175 recoveries, bringing the total number of recoveries to 4,996,232. The death toll remains to 36,957.
- Taiwan has reported 13,090 new cases, bringing the total number to 10,025,366. 46 new deaths were reported, bringing the death toll to 17,864.

==== 27 February ====
- Malaysia has reported 190 new cases, bringing the total number to 5,042,585. There are 177 recoveries, bringing the total number of recoveries to 4,996,409. The death toll remains 36,957.
- New Zealand has reported 9,100 new cases over the past week, bringing the total number to 2,216,852. There are 8,231 recoveries, bringing the total number of recoveries to 2,205,354. There are eight deaths, bringing the death toll to 2,542.
- Taiwan has reported 8,822 new cases, bringing the total number to 10,033,108. 44 new deaths were reported, bringing the death toll to 17,908.

==== 28 February ====
- Malaysia has reported 206 new cases, bringing the total number to 5,042,791. There are 176 recoveries, bringing the total number of recoveries to 4,996,585. One death was reported, bringing the death toll to 36,958.
- Taiwan has reported 10,120 new cases, bringing the total number to 10,043,227. 40 new deaths were reported, bringing the death toll to 17,948.
- American broadcaster Savannah Guthrie has tested positive for COVID-19 for the second time during a live broadcast.

=== March ===
==== 1 March ====
WHO Weekly Report:

- Malaysia has reported 217 new cases, bringing the total number to 5,043,008. There are 233 recoveries, bringing the total number of recoveries to 4,996,818. There are two deaths, bringing the death toll to 36,960.
- Taiwan has reported 12,212 new cases, bringing the total number to 10,055,439. 27 new deaths were reported, bringing the death toll to 17,975.

==== 2 March ====
- Malaysia has reported 244 new cases, bringing the total number to 5,043,252. There are 213 recoveries, bringing the total number of recoveries to 4,997,031. There are five deaths, bringing the death toll to 36,965.
- Taiwan has reported 12,032 new cases, bringing the total number to 10,069,539. 43 new deaths were reported, bringing the death toll to 18,010.

==== 3 March ====
- Malaysia has reported 204 new cases, bringing the total number to 5,043,456. There are 213 recoveries, bringing the total number of recoveries to 4,997,244. The death toll remains 36,965.
- Taiwan has reported 13,813 new cases, bringing the total number to 10,083,351. 62 new deaths were reported, bringing the death toll to 18,072.

==== 4 March ====
- Malaysia has reported 170 new cases, bringing the total number to 5,043,626. There are 178 recoveries, bringing the total number of recoveries to 4,997,422. The death toll remains 36,965.
- Taiwan has reported 11,397 new cases, bringing the total number to 10,094,733. 71 new deaths were reported, bringing the death toll to 18,143.

==== 5 March ====
- Malaysia has reported 164 new cases, bringing the total number to 5,043,790. There are 198 recoveries, bringing the total number of recoveries to 4,997,620. One death was reported, bringing the death toll to 36,966.
- Taiwan has reported 10,307 new cases, bringing the total number to 10,105,039. 60 new deaths were reported, bringing the death toll to 18,203.

==== 6 March ====
- Malaysia has reported 188 new cases, bringing the total number to 5,043,978. There are 181 recoveries, bringing the total number of recoveries to 4,997,801. The death toll remains 36,966.
- New Zealand has reported 11,453 new cases over the past week, bringing the total number to 2,228,291. There are 8,962 recoveries, bringing the total number of recoveries to 2,214,316. There are six deaths, bringing the death toll to 2,548.
- Taiwan has reported 7,080 new cases, bringing the total number to 10,112,117. 45 new deaths were reported, bringing the death toll to 18,248.

==== 7 March ====
- Malaysia has reported 226 new cases, bringing the total number to 5,044,204. There are 202 recoveries, bringing the total number of recoveries to 4,998,003. The death toll remains 36,966.
- Taiwan has reported 11,038 new cases, bringing the total number to 10,123,157. 34 new deaths were reported, bringing the death toll to 18,282.

==== 8 March ====
WHO Weekly Report:

- Malaysia has reported 235 new cases, bringing the total number to 5,044,439. There are 216 recoveries, bringing the total number of recoveries to 4,998,219. There was one death, bringing the death toll to 36,967.
- Taiwan has reported 11,060 new cases, bringing the total number to 10,134,211. 40 new deaths were reported, bringing the death toll to 18,322.
- California governor Gavin Newsom has tested positive for COVID-19 for the second time.

==== 9 March ====
- Malaysia has reported 279 new cases, bringing the total number to 5,044,718. There are 236 recoveries, bringing the total number of recoveries to 4,998,455. The death toll remains 36,967.
- Taiwan has reported 9,584 new cases, bringing the total number to 10,143,788. 49 new deaths were reported, bringing the death toll to 18,371.

==== 10 March ====
- Malaysia has reported 251 new cases, bringing the total number to 5,044,969. There are 197 recoveries, bringing the total number of recoveries to 4,998,652. The death toll remains 36,967.
- Taiwan has reported 9,098 new cases, bringing the total number to 10,152,881. 54 new deaths were reported, bringing the death toll to 18,425.

==== 11 March ====
- Malaysia has reported 223 new cases, bringing the total number to 5,045,192. There are 193 recoveries, bringing the total number of recoveries to 4,998,845. The death toll remains 36,967.
- Taiwan has reported 8,618 new cases, bringing the total number to 10,161,496. 48 new deaths were reported, bringing the death toll to 18,473.

==== 12 March ====
- Taiwan has reported 9,093 new cases, bringing the total number to 10,170,589. 39 new deaths were reported, bringing the death toll to 18,512.

==== 13 March ====
- New Zealand has reported 11,544 new cases over the past week, bringing the total number to 2,239,800. There are 11,417 recoveries, bringing the total number of recoveries to 2,225,733. There are 12 deaths, bringing the death toll to 2,560.
- Taiwan has reported 6,435 new cases, bringing the total number to 10,177,165. 37 new deaths were reported, bringing the death toll to 18,549.

==== 14 March ====
- Taiwan has reported 9,860 new cases, bringing the total number to 10,187,238. 28 new deaths were reported, bringing the death toll to 18,577.

==== 15 March ====
- Taiwan has reported 10,188 new cases, bringing the total number to 10,197,421. 42 new deaths were reported, bringing the death toll to 18,619.

==== 16 March ====
WHO Weekly Report:

- Taiwan has reported 9,062 new cases, bringing the total number to 10,206,482. 37 new deaths were reported, bringing the death toll to 18,656.

==== 17 March ====
- Taiwan has reported 8,416 new cases, bringing the total number to 10,214,788. 41 new deaths were reported, bringing the death toll to 18,697.

==== 18 March ====
- Malaysia has reported 270 new cases, bringing the total number to 5,047,040. There are 235 recoveries, bringing the total number of recoveries to 5,000,411. There are three deaths, bringing the death toll to 36,972.
- Taiwan has reported 8,026 new cases, bringing the total number to 10,222,922. 35 new deaths were reported, bringing the death toll to 18,732.

==== 19 March ====
- Austria surpasses 6 million COVID-19 cases.
- Taiwan has reported 8,419 new cases, bringing the total number to 10,231,343. 43 new deaths were reported, bringing the death toll to 18,775.

==== 20 March ====
- New Zealand has reported 11,171 new cases over the past week, bringing the total number of cases to 2,250,952. There are 11,483 recoveries, bringing the total number of recoveries to 2,237,216. There are 26 deaths, bringing the death toll to 2,586.
- Taiwan has reported 5,544 new cases, bringing the total number to 10,236,887. 28 new deaths were reported, bringing the death toll to 18,803.

==== 21 March ====
- Taiwan has reported 2,668 new cases, bringing the total number to 10,239,629. 20 new deaths were reported, bringing the death toll to 18,823.
- Lok Sabha member Kirron Kher has tested positive for COVID-19.

==== 22 March ====
WHO Weekly Report:

- Taiwan has reported 271 new cases, bringing the total number to 10,239,808. 29 new deaths were reported, bringing the death toll to 18,852.
- The United States of America surpasses 106 million cases.

==== 23 March ====
- Taiwan has reported 55 new cases, bringing the total number to 10,239,851. 40 new deaths were reported, bringing the death toll to 18,892.

==== 24 March ====
- Taiwan has reported 25 new cases, bringing the total number to 10,239,980. 39 new deaths were reported, bringing the death toll to 18,931.
- Indian American business executive Ajay Banga has tested positive for COVID-19.
- Indian film director and actress Pooja Bhatt has tested positive for COVID-19.

==== 25 March ====
- Malaysia has reported 355 new cases, bringing the total number to 5,049,268. 257 recoveries were reported, bringing the total number of recoveries to 5,002,242. Seven deaths were reported, bringing the death toll to 36,979.
- Taiwan has reported 14 new cases, bringing the total number to 10,239,994. 25 new deaths were reported, bringing the death toll to 18,956.

==== 26 March ====
- Taiwan has reported four new cases, bringing the total number to 10,239,998. 29 new deaths were reported, bringing the death toll to 18,985.

==== 27 March ====
- New Zealand has reported 11,258 new cases over the past week, bringing the total number to 2,262,186. There are 11,071 recoveries, bringing the total number of recoveries to 2,248,287. There are 76 deaths, bringing the death toll to 2,662.
- Taiwan has reported 20 new deaths, bringing the death toll to 19,005. The total number of cases remain at 10,239,998.

==== 28 March ====
- Taiwan has reported no new cases and deaths, which stand at 10,239,998 and 19,005 respectively.

==== 29 March ====
- Taiwan has reported no new cases and deaths, which stand at 10,239,998 and 19,005 respectively.

==== 30 March ====
WHO Weekly Report:

- Taiwan has reported 675 new cases and 175 deaths over the past week.
- Indian model Mahhi Vij has tested positive for COVID-19.

=== April ===
==== 1 April ====
- Malaysia reported 599 new cases, bringing the total number to 5,052,337. There were 375 recoveries, bringing the total number of recoveries to 5,004,043. There was one death, bringing the death toll to 36,982.
- WHO detected a new Omicron subvariant named XBB.1.16. The subvariant was found in the United States.

==== 3 April ====
- New Zealand has reported 12,202 new cases over the past week, bringing the total number to 2,274,370. There are 11,222 recoveries, bringing the total number of recoveries to 2,259,509. There are 25 deaths, bringing the death toll to 2,687.

==== 6 April ====
WHO Weekly Report:

==== 8 April ====
- Malaysia has reported 726 new cases, bringing the total number to 5,056,911. There are 584 recoveries, bringing the total number of recoveries to 5,006,634. There are 16 deaths, bringing the death toll to 36,994.

==== 10 April ====
- New Zealand has reported 12,129 new cases over the past week, bringing the total number to 2,286,481. There are 12,173 recoveries, bringing the total number of recoveries to 2,271,682. There are eight deaths, bringing the death toll to 2,695.

==== 13 April ====
WHO Weekly Report:

==== 15 April ====
- Malaysia has reported 881 new cases, bringing the total number to 5,062,060. There are 760 recoveries, bringing the total number of recoveries to 5,010,543. There are four deaths, bringing the death toll to 37,000.
- The Arcturus subvariant has mutated and developed a new symptom, as the virus is leading to a surge of new cases in India.

==== 17 April ====
- New Zealand has reported 14,242 new cases over the past week, bringing the total number to 2,300,696. There are 12,096 recoveries, bringing the total number of recoveries to 2,283,778. There are 21 deaths, bringing the death toll to 2,716.

==== 18 April ====
- South Korea has reported 15,173 new daily cases, surpassing 31 million relative cases, bringing the total number to 31,009,261.

==== 19 April ====
- American professional ring announcer Justin Roberts has tested positive for COVID-19.

==== 20 April ====
WHO Weekly Report:

- Thailand confirms its first death from the new Arcturus subvariant.

==== 22 April ====
- Malaysia has reported 562 new cases, bringing the total number to 5,066,877. There are 881 recoveries, bringing the total number of recoveries to 5,015,705. The death toll has reach 37,011.

==== 24 April ====
- New Zealand has reported 12,383 new cases over the past week, bringing the total number to 2,313,064. There are 14,189 recoveries, bringing the total number of recoveries to 2,297,967. There are 20 deaths, bringing the death toll to 2,736.
- Mexican president Andrés Manuel López Obrador has tested positive for COVID-19 for the third time.

==== 26 April ====
- Greece surpasses 6 million COVID-19 cases.

==== 27 April ====
WHO Weekly Report:

==== 29 April ====
- Malaysia has reported 1,050 new cases, bringing the total number to 5,071,840. There are 600 recoveries, bringing the total number of recoveries to 5,020,529. There are nine deaths, bringing the death toll to 37,020.

=== May ===
==== 1 May ====
- New Zealand has reported 11,063 new cases over the past week, bringing the total number to 2,324,094. There are 12,353 recoveries, bringing the total number of recoveries to 2,310,320. There are 26 deaths, bringing the death toll to 2,762.

==== 3 May ====
- France surpasses 40 million COVID-19 cases.

==== 4 May ====
WHO Weekly Report:

==== 5 May ====
- The Public Health Emergency of International Concern, the World Health Organization's highest alert level, was lifted for COVID-19.

==== 6 May ====
- Malaysia has reported 1,110 new cases, bringing the total number to 5,079,436. There are 1,112 recoveries, bringing the total number of recoveries to 5,025,566. The death toll reaches 37,028.

==== 8 May ====
- New Zealand has reported 12,277 new cases over the past week, bringing the total number to 2,336,352. There are 11,019 recoveries, bringing the total number of recoveries to 2,321,339. There are 30 deaths, bringing the death toll to 2,792.

==== 11 May ====
WHO Weekly Report:

- The United States' public health emergency designation expires

==== 13 May ====
- Malaysia has reported 1,205 new cases, bringing the total number to 5,088,009. There are 1,248 recoveries, bringing the total number of recoveries to 5,029,873. There are 18 deaths, bringing the death toll to 37,046.

==== 15 May ====
- New Zealand has reported 11,739 new cases, bringing the total number to 2,348,074. There are 12,182 recoveries, bringing the total number of recoveries to 2,333,521. 58 deaths were reported, bringing the death toll to 2,850.

==== 18 May ====
WHO Weekly Report:

==== 20 May ====
- Malaysia has reported 786 new cases, bringing the total number to 5,094,448. There are 1,272 recoveries, bringing the total number of recoveries to 5,038,256. There are three deaths, bringing the death toll to 37,070.

==== 21 May ====
- The United States of America surpasses 107 million cases.

==== 22 May ====
- New Zealand has reported 14,657 new cases over the past week, bringing the total number to 2,362,225. There are 12,580 recoveries, bringing the total number of recoveries to 2,346,101. There are 43 deaths, bringing the death toll to 2,893.
- Singaporean Prime Minister Lee Hsien Loong has tested positive for COVID-19.
- Tokelau reported its first community case on Nukunonu, the dependency's largest atoll.

==== 25 May ====
WHO Weekly Report:

==== 26 May ====
Tokelau has reported a total of four community cases.

==== 27 May ====
- Malaysia has reported 782 new cases, bringing the total number to 5,100,249. There are 779 recoveries, bringing the total number of recoveries to 5,044,652. There was one death, bringing the death toll to 37,087.

==== 29 May ====
- New Zealand has reported 14,371 new cases over the past week, bringing the total number to 2,375,191. 12,275 have recovered, bringing the total number of recoveries to 2,358,376. There are 49 deaths, bringing the death tolls to 2,942.

=== June ===
==== 1 June ====
WHO Weekly Report:

- K-Pop singer Jisoo of Blackpink has tested positive for COVID-19 and will not perform on her upcoming world tour concert in Osaka.
- Singaporean Prime Minister Lee Hsien Loong has tested positive for COVID-19 for the second time in a rebound case.

==== 2 June ====
- Malaysia has reported 569 new cases, bringing the total number to 5,104,772. There are 845 recoveries, bringing the total number of recoveries to 5,050,356. The death toll has risen to 37,100.

==== 5 June ====
- New Zealand has reported 12,028 new cases, bringing the total number to 2,387,201. There are 13,836 recoveries, bringing the total number of recoveries to 2,372,212. There are 59 deaths, bringing the death toll to 3,001.

==== 8 June ====
WHO Weekly Report:

==== 10 June ====
- Malaysia has reported 618 new cases, bringing the total number to 5,108,586. There are 626 recoveries, bringing the total number of recoveries to 5,053,329. 10 deaths were reported, bringing the death toll to 37,110.

==== 12 June ====
- New Zealand has reported 9,883 new cases, bringing the total number to 2,397,065. There are 11,960 recoveries, bringing the total number of recoveries to 2,384,172. There are 37 deaths, bringing the death toll to 3,038.

==== 15 June ====
WHO Weekly Report:

==== 17 June ====
- Malaysia has reported 400 new cases, bringing the total number to 5,112,019. There are 630 recoveries, bringing the total number of recoveries to 5,057,145. There are eight deaths, bringing the death toll to 37,118.

==== 19 June ====
- New Zealand has reported 8,544 new cases, bringing the total number to 2,405,595. There are 9,833 recoveries, bringing the total number of recoveries to 2,394,005. There are 39 deaths, bringing the death toll to 3,077.

==== 22 June ====
WHO Weekly Report:

==== 24 June ====
- Malaysia has reported 341 new cases, bringing the total number to 5,114,717. There are 541 recoveries, bringing the total number of recoveries to 5,061,264. There are nine deaths, bringing the death toll to 37,127.

==== 26 June ====
- New Zealand has reported 7,702 new cases, bringing the total number to 2,413,279. There are 8,485 recoveries, bringing the total number of recoveries to 2,402,490. There are 40 deaths, bringing the death toll to 3,117.

==== 29 June ====
WHO Weekly Report:

=== July ===
==== 1 July ====
- Malaysia has reported 171 new cases, bringing the total number to 5,116,265. There are 333 recoveries, bringing the total number of recoveries to 5,064,159. There are 25 deaths, bringing the death toll to 37,152.

==== 3 July ====
- New Zealand has reported 6,578 new cases over the past week, bringing the total number to 2,419,839. There are 7,681 recoveries, bringing the total number of recoveries to 2,410,171. There are 21 deaths, bringing the death toll to 3,138.

==== 6 July ====
WHO Weekly Report:

==== 8 July ====
- Malaysia has reported 139 new cases, bringing the total number to 5,117,487. There are 167 cases, bringing the total number of recoveries to 5,066,437. There are six deaths, bringing the death toll to 37,158.

==== 10 July ====
- New Zealand has reported 5,417 new cases over the past week, bringing the total number to 2,425,237. There are 6,511 recoveries, bringing the total number of recoveries to 2,416,682. There are 21 deaths, bringing the death toll to 3,159.

==== 13 July ====
WHO Weekly Report:

==== 15 July ====
- Malaysia has reported 173 new cases, bringing the total number to 5,118,689. There are 141 cases, bringing the total number of recoveries to 5,067,662. There are two deaths, bringing the death toll to 37,160.

==== 17 July ====
- New Zealand has reported 4,332 new cases over the past week, bringing the total number to 2,429,544. There are 5,387 recoveries, bringing the total number of recoveries to 2,422,069. There are 13 deaths, bringing the death toll to 3,172.

==== 20 July ====
WHO Weekly Report:

==== 22 July ====
- Malaysia has reported 129 new cases, bringing the total number of 5,119,647. There are 189 recoveries, bringing the total number of recoveries to 5,068,858. There are three deaths, bringing the death toll to 37,163.
- The Philippines has lifted their declaration of the State of Public Health Emergency for COVID-19, initially declared by former president Rodrigo Duterte on March 9, 2020, through a proclamation signed by incumbent president Bongbong Marcos

==== 24 July ====
- New Zealand has reported 3,764 new cases over the past week, bringing the total number to 2,433,293. There are 4,294 recoveries, bringing the total number of recoveries to 2,426,363. There are 16 deaths, bringing the death toll to 3,188.

==== 27 July ====
WHO Weekly Report:

==== 29 July ====
- Malaysia has reported 130 new cases, bringing the total number of 5,120,581. There are 115 cases, bringing the total number of recoveries to 5,069,820. There is one death, bringing the death toll to 37,164.

==== 31 July ====
- New Zealand has reported 3,615 new cases over the past week, bringing the total number to 2,436,894. There are 3,718 recoveries, bringing the total number of recoveries to 2,426,363. There are 31 deaths, bringing the death toll to 3,219.

=== August ===
==== 3 August ====
WHO Weekly Report:

==== 5 August ====
- Malaysia has reported 105 new cases, bringing the total number of 5,121,276. There are 128 recoveries, bringing the total number of recoveries to 5,070,750. There is one death, bringing the death toll to 37,165.

==== 7 August ====
- New Zealand has reported 4,645 new cases over the past week, bringing the total number to 2,441,517. There are 3,597 recoveries, bringing the total number of recoveries to 2,433,678. There are 10 deaths, bringing the death toll to 3,229.

==== 10 August ====
- WHO Weekly Report:
- Malaysian Health Ministry and Election Commission confirm that COVID-19 positive votes will receive guidelines via the MySejahtera app on how to fulfill their voting responsibilities.

==== 12 August ====
- Malaysia has reported 73 cases, bringing the total number to 5,121,858. There are 96 recoveries, bringing the total number of recoveries to 5,072,092. The death toll remains 37,165.

==== 14 August ====
- New Zealand has reported 5,372 new cases over the past week, bringing the total number to 2,446,874. There are 4,604 recoveries, bringing the total number of recoveries to 2,438,282. There are 20 deaths, bringing the death toll to 3,249.

==== 17 August ====
WHO Weekly Report:

==== 19 August ====
- Malaysia has reported 114 new cases, bringing the total number to 5,122,568. There are 65 recoveries, bringing the total number of recoveries to 5,072,678. The death toll remains 37,165.

==== 21 August ====
- New Zealand has reported 3,953 new cases, bringing the total number to 2,450,818. There are 5,341 recoveries, bringing the total number of recoveries to 2,443,623. There are 12 deaths, bringing the death toll to 3,261.

==== 25 August ====
WHO Weekly Report:

==== 26 August ====
- Malaysia has reported 90 new cases, bringing the total number to 5,123,264. There are 111 recoveries, bringing the total number of recoveries to 5,073,384. The death toll remains 37,165.

==== 28 August ====
- New Zealand has reported 3,484 new cases over the past week, bringing the total number to 2,454,300. There are 3,917 recoveries, bringing the total number of recoveries to 2,447,540. There are 22 deaths, bringing the death toll to 3,283.

=== September ===
==== 1 September ====
WHO Weekly Report:

==== 2 September ====
- Malaysia has reported 57 new cases, bringing the total number to 5,123,801. There are 97 recoveries, bringing the total number of recoveries to 5,074,097. The death toll remains 37,165.

==== 4 September ====
- New Zealand has reported 3,625 new cases over the past week, bringing the total number to 2,457,924. There are 3,477 recoveries, bringing the total number of recoveries to 2,451,017. There are 11 deaths, bringing the death toll to 3,294.

==== 6 September ====
- The WHO said it had observed “concerning” trends in COVID-19 case numbers and hospitalisations, although analysis was hampered because many countries were no longer recording COVID-19 case statistics.

==== 9 September ====
- Malaysia has reported 108 new cases, bringing the total number to 5,124,481. There are 53 recoveries, bringing the total number of recoveries to 5,076,104. There are two deaths, bringing the death toll to 37,167.

==== 11 September ====
- New Zealand has reported 3,458 new cases over the past week, bringing the total number to 2,461,379. There are 3,609 recoveries, bringing the total number of recoveries to 2,454,626. There are 15 deaths, bringing the death toll to 3,309.

==== 16 September ====
- Malaysia has reported 91 new cases, bringing the total number to 5,125,209. There are 116 recoveries, bringing the total number of recoveries to 5,076,796. There are four deaths, bringing the death toll to 37,171.

==== 18 September ====
- New Zealand has reported 3,458 new cases, bringing the total number to 2,461,379. There are 3,609 recoveries, bringing the total number of recoveries to 2,454,626. There are 15 deaths, bringing the death toll to 3,309.

==== 23 September ====
- Malaysia has reported 87 new cases, bringing the total number to 5,125,900. There are 89 recoveries, bringing the total number of recoveries to 5,077,516. There was one death, bringing the death toll to 37,172.

==== 25 September ====
- New Zealand has reported 2,998 new cases over the past week, bringing the total number to 2,467,468. There are 3,055 recoveries, bringing the total number of recoveries to 2,461,144. There are 18 deaths, bringing the death toll to 3,347.

==== 29 September ====
WHO Situation Report:

==== 30 September ====
- Malaysia has reported 97 new cases, bringing the total number to 5,126,683. There are 91 recoveries, bringing the total number of recoveries to 5,078,210. There are three deaths, binging the death toll to 37,175.

=== October ===
==== 2 October ====
- New Zealand has reported 2,968 new cases over the past week, bringing the total number to 2,470,435. There are 2,976 recoveries, bringing the total number of recoveries to 2,464,120. There are 14 deaths, bringing the death toll to 3,361.

==== 7 October ====
- Malaysia has reported 142 new cases, bringing the total number to 5,127,616. There are 91 recoveries, bringing the total number of recoveries to 5,078,992. There are two deaths, bringing the death toll to 37,177.

==== 9 October ====
- New Zealand has reported 3,571 new cases, bringing the total number to 2,474,005. There are 2,943 recoveries, bringing the total number of recoveries to 2,467,063. There are 15 deaths, bringing the death toll to 3,376.

==== 14 October ====
- Malaysia has reported 181 new cases, bringing the total number to 5,128,668. There are 131 recoveries, bringing the total number of recoveries to 5,079,933. There was two deaths, bringing the death toll to 37,179.

==== 16 October ====
- New Zealand has reported 3,816 new cases, bringing the total number to 2,477,820. There are 3,560 recoveries, bringing the total number of recoveries to 2,470,623. There are 17 deaths, bringing the death toll to 3,393.

==== 21 October ====
- Malaysia has reported 157 new cases, bringing the total number to 5,129,800. There are 176 recoveries, bringing the total number of recoveries to 5,080,973. There are two deaths, bringing the death toll to 37,181.

==== 22 October ====
- In the United Kingdom in October, following a steep rise in COVID-19 cases, healthcare facilities began reinstating face-masking policies for visitors and patients.

==== 24 October ====
- New Zealand has reported 4,018 new cases over the past week, bringing the total number to 2,481,834. There are 3,782 recoveries, bringing the total number of recoveries to 2,474,405. There are 23 deaths, bringing the death toll to 3,416.

==== 27 October ====
WHO Situation Report:

==== 28 October ====
- Malaysia has reported 207 new cases, bringing the total number to 5,131,139. There are 151 recoveries, bringing the total number of recoveries to 5,082,106. The death toll remains 37,181.

==== 30 October ====
- New Zealand has reported 3,934 new cases, bringing the total number to 2,485,937. There are 3,997 recoveries, bringing the total number of recoveries to 2,478,402. There are 29 deaths, bringing the death toll to 3,445.

=== November ===
==== 4 November ====
- Malaysia has reported 262 new cases, bringing the total number to 5,132,831. There are 810 recoveries, bringing the total number of recoveries to 5,084,061. There are five deaths, bringing the death toll to 37,186.

==== 6 November ====
- New Zealand has reported 5,872 new cases, bringing the total number to 2,491,809. There are 4,079 recoveries, bringing the total number of recoveries to 2,482,481. There are 19 deaths, bringing the death toll to 3,464.

==== 9 November ====
- In response to viral mutations and changing characteristics of infection, the WHO adjusted its treatment guidelines. Among other changes, remdesivir and molnupiravir were now recommended only for the most severe cases, and deuremidevir and ivermectin were recommended against.

==== 13 November ====
- New Zealand has reported 5,947 new cases, bringing the total number to 2,497,753. There are 5,828 recoveries, bringing the total number of recoveries to 2,488,309. There are 38 deaths, bringing the death toll to 3,502.

==== 20 November ====
- New Zealand has reported 7,881 new cases, bringing the total number to 2,505,632. There are 5,937 recoveries, bringing the total number of recoveries to 2,494,246. There are 20 deaths, bringing the death toll to 3,522.

==== 23 November ====
- Malaysia reported 2,305 cases between 12 and 18 November, including 28 new Omicron variant cases.

==== 24 November ====
WHO Situation Report:

==== 25 November ====
- Singapore has reported 22,094 new cases over the past week, more than double the last week. It added that the number of hospitalisations has remained stable.

==== 27 November ====
- New Zealand has reported 6,814 cases, bringing the total number to 2,512,440. There are 7,852 recoveries, bringing the total number of recoveries to 2,502,098. There are 27 deaths, bringing the death toll to 3,549.

=== December ===
==== 2 December ====
- Malaysia has reported 1,126 cases, bringing the total number to 5,147,359. There are 610 recoveries, bringing the total number of recoveries to 5,094,830. The death toll has risen to 37,202.

==== 4 December ====
- New Zealand has reported 6,656 cases, bringing the total number to 2,519,095. There are 6,777 recoveries, bringing the total number of recoveries to 2,508,875. 20 deaths were reported, bringing the death toll to 3,569.

==== 5 December ====
- Poland's former President Lech Wałęsa hospitalized with COVID-19

==== 8 December ====
- Singapore has reported a record high of 32,035 new cases over the past week, putting a number of hospitalisations on the rise as well.

==== 9 December ====
- Malaysia has reported 2,554 new cases, bringing the total number to 5,160,116. There are 1,164 recoveries, bringing the total number of recoveries to 5,102,881. There are 16 deaths, bringing the death toll to 37,218.

==== 11 December ====
- New Zealand has reported 7,880 new cases, bringing the total number to 2,526,109. There are 6,647 recoveries, bringing the total number of recoveries to 2,515,522. There are 27 deaths, bringing the death toll to 3,596.

==== 13 December ====
- CDC has detected a new and highly infectious Omicron subvariant named JN.1, which is soon spreading rapidly across the globe.

==== 15 December ====
- Singapore has reported a record high of 56,043 new cases over the past week, as MOH is taking additional measures to protect the healthcare capacity.

==== 16 December ====
- Malaysia has reported 3,389 new cases, bringing the total number to 5,180,812. There are 2,276 recoveries, bringing the total number of recoveries to 5,115,191. There are two deaths, bringing the death toll to 37,246.

==== 18 December ====
- New Zealand has reported 7,417 new cases over the past week, bringing the total number to 2,533,522. There are 6,974 recoveries, bringing the total number of recoveries to 2,522,496. There are 27 deaths, bringing the death toll to 3,623.

==== 21 December ====
- Several Southeast Asian countries including Malaysia and Singapore have reported a surge in COVID-19 cases.
- The spread of the JN.1 Omicron variant has led to a surge of COVID-19 cases in New Zealand, resulting in 400 hospitalisations per week and 25 deaths. The JN.1 variant accounted for 14% of sequenced cases reported in New Zealand during the week leading up to 15 December.

==== 22 December ====
WHO Situation Report:

- Singapore has reported a record high of 58,300 new cases over the past week. The number of hospital and ICU admissions are also the highest at 965 and 32 respectively.

==== 23 December ====
- Malaysia has reported 3,499 new cases, bringing the total number to 5,206,724. There are 3,376 recoveries, bringing the total number of recoveries to 5,136,171. There are 22 deaths, bringing the death toll to 37,268.

==== 30 December ====
- Malaysia has reported 2,803 cases, bringing the total number to 5,227,322. There are 3,488 recoveries, bringing the total number of recoveries to 5,162,135. There are five deaths, bringing the death toll to 37,293.

== Summary ==
As of 2023, only the following countries and territories had not reported any cases of SARS-CoV-2 infections:

Asia

- Turkmenistan (generally considered to have had cases nonetheless)

The remaining territories are all remote subantarctic or Antarctic lands with no permanent population.

Antarctica

- British Antarctic Territory
- Peter I Island

Overseas

- Bouvet Island
- Heard Island and McDonald Islands
- Prince Edward Islands
- South Georgia and the South Sandwich Islands

== See also ==
- Timeline of the COVID-19 pandemic
