= Deuremidevir =

Antiviral drug

Clinical data
- Trade names: 民得维
- Other names: VV116, JT001, mindeudesivir, renmindevir
- Routes of administration: oral

Legal status
- Legal status: US: Investigational drug; CN: conditially Rx

Identifiers
- IUPAC name: [(2R,3R,4R,5R)-5-(4-amino-5-deuteriopyrrolo[2,1-f][1,2,4]triazin-7-yl)-5-cyano-3,4-bis(2-methylpropanoyloxy)oxolan-2-yl]methyl 2-methylpropanoate
- CAS Number: 2647442-33-7
- PubChem CID: 163358784
- ChemSpider: 115285279
- UNII: MF2PS6XPS4

Chemical and physical data
- Formula: C_{24}H_{30}DN_{5}O_{7}
- Molar mass: 502.546 g·mol^{−1}
- 3D model (JSmol): Interactive image
- SMILES: [2H]c2cc([C@]1(C#N)O[C@H](COC(=O)C(C)C)[C@@H](OC(=O)C(C)C)[C@H]1OC(=O)C(C)C)n3ncnc(N)c23
- InChI: InChI=InChI=1S/C24H31N5O7/c1-12(2)21(30)33-9-16-18(34-22(31)13(3)4)19(35-23(32)14(5)6)24(10-25,36-16)17-8-7-15-20(26)27-11-28-29(15)17/h7-8,11-14,16,18-19H,9H2,1-6H3,(H2,26,27,28)/t16-,18-,19-,24+/m1/s1/i7D; Key:RVSSLHFYCSUAHY-QXMJNOOVSA-N

Deuremidevir, also known as VV116, is a nucleoside analogue antiviral drug. It is administrated through oral tablets, which contain the hydrobromide salt of this drug.

The drug is a deuterated tri-isobutyrate of GS-441524, the active metabolite of remdesivir. It was first described in a November 2020 preprint by a team including members of Wuhan Institute of Virology and Vigonvita. It completed a phase 3 trial in 2022. Results from a separate Phase 3 trial conducted in mainland China from October 2022 to January 2023 suggested that deuremidevir may shorten the duration of COVID-19 symptoms in non-hospitalized adults with mild-to-moderate disease compared to placebo. Junshi, which markets the drug, received conditional approval from China's National Medical Products Administration in January 2023.

In November 2023, in response to viral mutations and changing characteristics of infection, the WHO adjusted its treatment guidelines. Among other changes, the use of deuremidevir was recommended against, except for clinical trials.

== Research ==
In preclinical studies, a single high dose of the drug (at least 1.0 g/kg) was shown to be tolerated in rats and dogs.
