= CMX521 =

Chemical compound

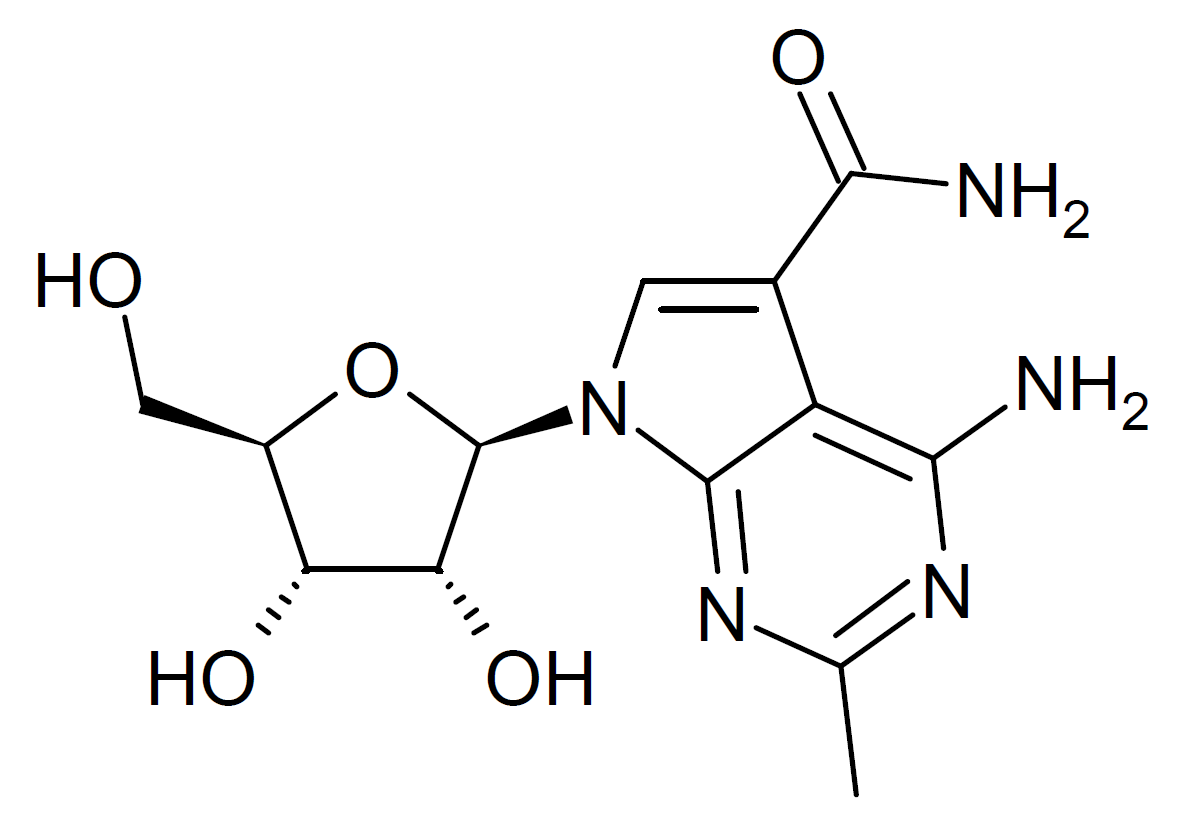

Legal status
- Legal status: US: Investigational drug

Identifiers
- IUPAC name: 4-amino-7-[(2R,3R,4S,5R)-3,4-dihydroxy-5-(hydroxymethyl)oxolan-2-yl]-2-methylpyrrolo[2,3-d]pyrimidine-5-carboxamide
- CAS Number: 2077178-99-3
- PubChem CID: 126520436
- ChemSpider: 95601723
- UNII: 76US2C2X3F

Chemical and physical data
- Formula: C_{13}H_{17}N_{5}O_{5}
- Molar mass: 323.309 g·mol^{−1}
- 3D model (JSmol): Interactive image
- SMILES: CC1=NC(=C2C(=CN(C2=N1)[C@H]3[C@@H]([C@@H]([C@H](O3)CO)O)O)C(=O)N)N
- InChI: InChI=1S/C13H17N5O5/c1-4-16-10(14)7-5(11(15)22)2-18(12(7)17-4)13-9(21)8(20)6(3-19)23-13/h2,6,8-9,13,19-21H,3H2,1H3,(H2,15,22)(H2,14,16,17)/t6-,8-,9-,13-/m1/s1; Key:PMQFVTNOZQVIOK-HTVVRFAVSA-N

CMX521 is an antiviral drug discovered by Chimerix, which was developed for the treatment of norovirus, though it also shows efficacy against related viral diarrheas such as rotavirus and some sapoviruses, astroviruses and adenoviruses. It is a nucleoside analogue which acts as an inhibitor of viral RNA-dependant RNA polymerase.

== See also ==
- GS-441524
- NITD008
- Sangivamycin
