= Obeldesivir =

Antiviral drug

Names
- IUPAC name [(2R,3S,4R,5R)-5-(4-Aminopyrrolo[2,1-f][1,2,4]triazin-7-yl)-5-cyano-3,4-dihydroxyoxolan-2-yl]methyl 2-methylpropanoate

Identifiers
CAS Number	2647441-36-7
3D model (JSmol)	Interactive image
ChEMBL	ChEMBL4863829
ChemSpider	115037299
KEGG	D12776
PubChem CID	162513664
UNII	Q55KCM7PXB
- InChI: InChI=1S/C16H19N5O5/c1-8(2)15(24)25-5-10-12(22)13(23)16(6-17,26-10)11-4-3-9-14(18)19-7-20-21(9)11/h3-4,7-8,10,12-13,22-23H,5H2,1-2H3,(H2,18,19,20)/t10-,12-,13-,16+/m1/s1 Key: YIHPGVCWGSURHO-VSBTWAGUSA-N
- SMILES: CC(C)C(=O)OC[C@@H]1[C@H]([C@H]([C@](O1)(C#N)C2=CC=C3N2N=CN=C3N)O)O

Properties
Chemical formula	C_{16}H_{19}N_{5}O_{5}
Molar mass	361.358 g·mol^{−1}
- Except where otherwise noted, data are given for materials in their standard state (at 25 °C [77 °F], 100 kPa). Infobox references

Obeldesivir (GS-5245, ATV006) is an isobutyric monoester prodrug of GS-441524 made by Gilead Sciences that was evaluated in a Phase III trial for the outpatient treatment of COVID-19 in high risk patients. The purpose of the isobutyric ester modification on obeldesivir is to improve the oral bioavailability of the parent nucleoside, GS-441524. Obeldesivir is hydrolyzed to the active parent nucleoside, GS-441524, which is in turn converted to remdesivir-triphosphate (GS-443902) by host kinase enzymes.

GS-443902 is a bioactive ATP analogue with broad-spectrum antiviral activity and is the same compound formed by remdesivir, though by a different enzymatic pathway. Unlike remdesivir, which is metabolized by enzymes that are highly expressed in the liver, GS-441524 released by obeldesivir is metabolized by enzymes that are evenly expressed throughout the body. Due to their different metabolic pathways, obeldesivir can be administered orally, whereas remdesivir must be administered intravenously for COVID-19 treatment. Obeldesivir is also currently being investigated as a potential antiviral treatment for Ebola.

The pharmacokinetic properties of obeldesivir and improved was first published by Chinese researchers in May 2022. The Chinese group pursued investigation of obeldesivir independently from Gilead Sciences. Compared to IV administered GS-441524 in rats at 5 mg/kg, orally administered obeldesivir at 25 mg/kg (referred to as "ATV006") yielded approximately 22% bioavailability. Treatment with obdeldesivir reduced viral load and prevents lung pathology in KI-hACE2 and Ad5-hACE2 mouse models of SARS-CoV-2.

In the recently completed randomized trial conducted among nonhospitalized adults with risk factors for developing severe COVID-19, patients were enrolled within 5 days of COVID-19 symptom onset and randomized to receive obeldesivir 350 mg or placebo twice daily for 5 days. The primary endpoint was COVID-19–related hospitalization or death due to any cause by Day 29. Other endpoints included time to symptom alleviation by Day 15, change in SARS-CoV-2 viral RNA copy number and infectious viral titer, and incidence of adverse events and laboratory abnormalities.

The trial had a target sample size of 2300 participants but was halted early due to a lower-than-expected event rate for the primary endpoint. 465 participants were evaluable for safety and 418 for efficacy. 92% had serologic evidence of prior SARS-CoV-2 infection or COVID-19 vaccination, which likely explains why COVID-19–related hospitalization or death by Day 29 occurred in none of the 211 (0%) participants assigned to receive obeldesivir and only of 1 of the 207 (0.5%) assigned to placebo. Time to COVID-19 symptom alleviation was numerically shorter by 2 days with obeldesivir than with placebo, although this difference was not statistically significant. However, obeldesivir did significantly reduce viral RNA copy number at Day 5 and infectious viral titer at Days 3 and 5 compared to placebo. The safety profile was generally comparable between active drug and placebo.
