= ETAR (antiviral) =

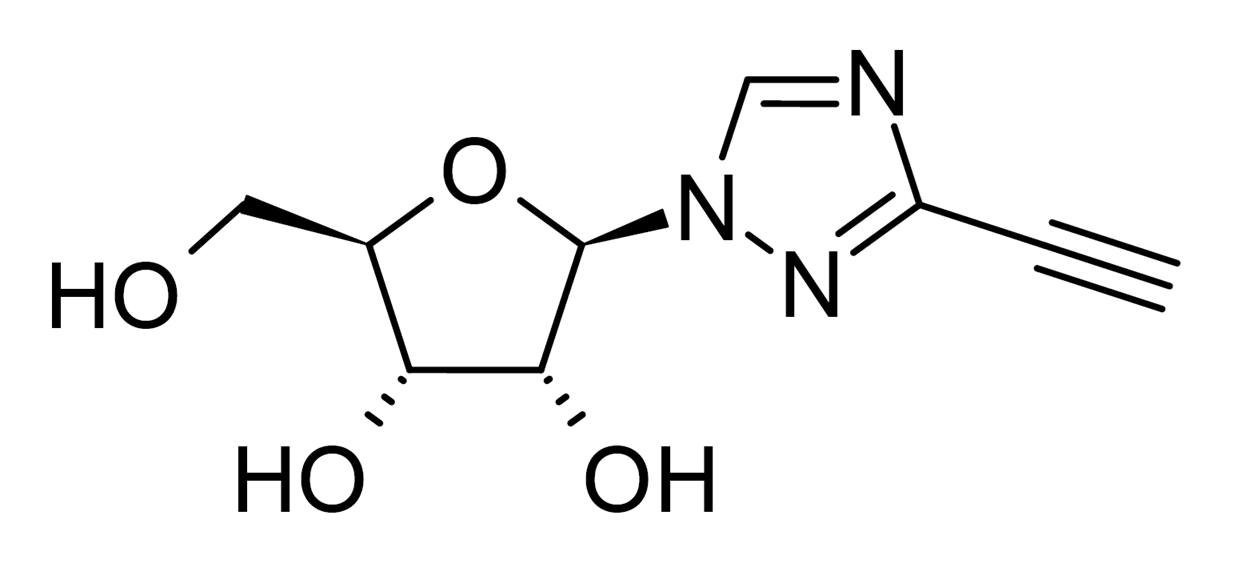

Legal status
- Legal status: US: Investigational New Drug

Identifiers
- IUPAC name: (2R,3R,4S,5R)-2-(3-ethynyl-1,2,4-triazol-1-yl)-5-(hydroxymethyl)oxolane-3,4-diol
- PubChem CID: 24771258

Chemical and physical data
- Formula: C_{9}H_{11}N_{3}O_{4}
- Molar mass: 225.204 g·mol^{−1}
- 3D model (JSmol): Interactive image
- SMILES: C#CC1=NN(C=N1)[C@H]2[C@@H]([C@@H]([C@H](O2)CO)O)O
- InChI: InChI=1S/C9H11N3O4/c1-2-6-10-4-12(11-6)9-8(15)7(14)5(3-13)16-9/h1,4-5,7-9,13-15H,3H2/t5-,7-,8-,9-/m1/s1; Key:ZCYWFUPNZBYYLW-ZOQUXTDFSA-N

ETAR (1β-D-ribofuranosyl-3-ethynyl-[1,2,4]triazole) is a nucleoside analogue which has antiviral effects, related to compounds such as EICAR. It shows broad spectrum antiviral action against viruses such as hantaviruses, flaviviruses and bunyaviruses.

== See also ==
- Favipiravir
- Ribavirin
