= Mexican Hairless Cat =

Mexican Hairless
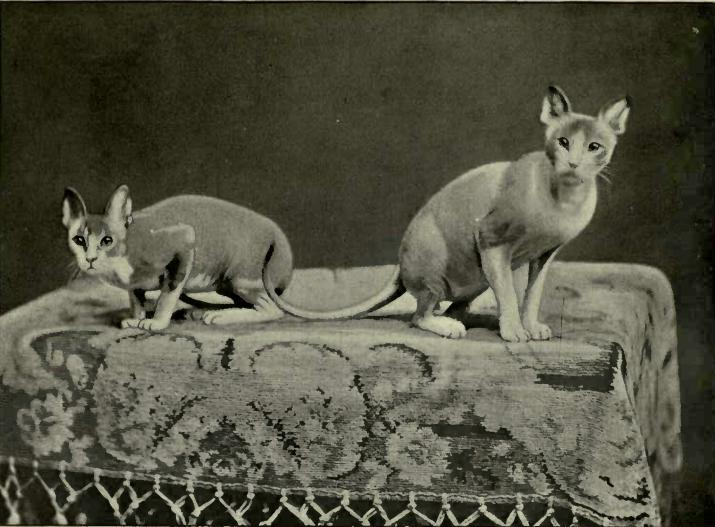
- Origin: New Mexico
- Breed status: Not recognized as a standardized breed by any major breed registry.

The Mexican Hairless cat, also known as the Aztec cat or New Mexican Hairless cat was a purported breed of cat first documented in 1902 by Mr. E. J. Shinick, who owned a pair of hairless cats.

Despite having long whiskers and eyebrows and being known to sprout light fur around their backs and tails in the winter, the cats were considered novelties at the time due to their lack of a furry coat. Their lack of a coat causes them to lose more body heat than other cat breeds. This resulted in this breed being both heat-seeking and warm to the touch.

== History ==
In 1902, a couple from New Mexico received two hairless cats from a local Pueblo community. These were ostensibly the last survivors of an ancient Aztec breed of cat. The cats were littermates and noted to be 25% smaller than local shorthair cats. They were normally whiskered and seasonally coated, growing a ridge of fur down the mid-back and tail during the colder seasons. These were not the first hairless cats exhibited in the US, but they became the most famous. An earlier detailed report was of a pair of hairless cats in The Boston Post, January 22, 1878. Those cats were a brother and sister, with the brother being named "Scud" and the sister, “Mystery”. They were owned by William P. Marshall and were exhibited. Although novelties, they had an ordinary background, being born to a normal shorthair cat, and did not become a sensation.

In The Book of the Cat (1903, Public Domain), Frances Simpson reproduced a letter written by Mr. E. J. Shinick to Mr. H. C. Brooke regarding Mr. Shinick's hairless cats. Mr. Brooke commented "A most extraordinary variety, of which next to nothing appears to be known, is the hairless cat, and we cannot do better than quote in extenso the description given by the owner of what, if his surmise should unhappily prove to be correct, was the last pair of these peculiar animals, a portrait of which we give. We can only add, while deeply regretting that Mr. Shinick did not mate his cats, the earnest hope that we may hear that he has discovered the existence of other specimens."

From The Book of the Cat, Frances Simpson, 1903 (public domain):

In answer would say my hairless cats are brother and sister. I got them from the Indians a few miles from this place. The old Jesuit Fathers tell me they are the last of the Aztec breed known only in New Mexico. I have found them the most intelligent and affectionate family pets I have ever met in the cat line; they are the quickest in action and smartest cats I have ever seen. They are fond of a warm bath, and love to sleep under the clothes at night with our little girl. They seem to understand nearly everything that is said to them; but I have never had time to train them. They are marked exactly alike - with mouse coloured backs; with neck, stomach and legs a delicate flesh tint. Their bodies are always warm and soft as a child's. They love to be fondled and caressed, and are very playful; will run up and down your body and around your waist like a flash.

"Nellie" weighs about eight pounds, and "Dick" weighed ten pounds; but I am sorry to say we have lost "Dick". We have never allowed them to go out of the house, as the dogs would be after them. They were very fond of our water spaniel and would sleep with her. "Dick" was a sly rascal and would steal out. One night last year he stole out, and the dogs finished him. His loss was very great, as I may never replace him. The Chicago Cat Club valued them at 1,000 dollars each. They were very anxious for me to come on with them for their cat shows, but I could not go. They were never on exhibition; as this is a small city, I feared they would be stolen. I have made every endeavour to get another mate for "Nellie" but have not been successful. I never allowed them to mate, as they were brother and sister, and I thought it might alter "Nellie's" beautiful form, which is round and handsome, with body rather long. In winter they have a light fur on back and ridge of tail, which falls off in warm weather. They stand the cold weather the same as other cats. They are not like the hairless dogs, whose hide is solid and tough; they are soft and delicate, with very loose skin.

"Nellie" has a very small head, large amber eyes, extra-long moustache and eyebrows; her voice now is a good baritone, when young it sounded exactly like a child's. They have great appetites and are quite dainty eaters - fried chicken and good steak is their choice. Have never been sick an hour. The enclosed faded picture is the only one I have at present - it is very lifelike, as it shows the wrinkles in its fine, soft skin. "Dick" was a very powerful cat; could whip any dog alone; his courage, no doubt, was the cause of his death. He always was the boss over our dogs. I have priced "Nellie" at 300 dollars. She is too valuable for me to keep in a small town. Many wealthy ladies would value her at her weight in gold if they knew what a very rare pet she is. I think in your position she would be a very good investment to exhibit at cat shows and other select events, as she doubtless is the only hairless cat now known. I have written to Old Mexico and all over this country without finding another. I would like to have her in some large museum where she would interest and be appreciated by thousands of people.

E. J. Shinick, Albuquerque, New Mexico, February 3, 1902 In Animal Life and the World of Nature (Vol 1, 1902-1903), Mr. Shinick was quoted:

"Dick was a very powerful cat and could whip any dog alone; his courage no doubt was the cause of his death. He was a sly rascal and would steal out, and one night he got out and several dogs killed him. His loss was very great, and I may never replace him. The Chicago Cat Club valued him at 1,000 dollars. I have sent all over the country and endeavoured to get a mate for 'Nellie,' but I fear the breed is extinct".

Mr. Shinick's cats, acquired in 1894, were reported in the press as Aztec cats, the last of their kind. At that time, distinctive non-pedigree cats were sometimes exhibited as curiosities or celebrities and their stories were displayed on their cages. It is conceivable that the story of a nearly extinct Aztec breed was invented to make random-bred hairless cats appear more exotic. According to a report in The Albuquerque Citizen, Albuquerque, New Mexico, dated Wednesday, May 6, 1903:

T. J. Shinick was about the last man to shake hands with the president (Roosevelt). . . . Shinick gave him a little present for his sick boy Archie. It was a large photo of Aztec cats raised by the Indians, and the only two hairless cats known in captivity. Both the President and Secretary Loeb was greatly pleased with the picture.

The male cat, Dick, died in 1902 or 1903. In 1908, the female, Nellie, died. According to The New York Times of December 31, 1908:

Cats and chickens were rivals for popular favor in Madison Square Garden yesterday, and the cats on the occasion, of the formal opening of the Atlantic Cat Club’s seventh annual 'Championship Show' had a shade the advantage. The opening of the cats’ part of the exhibition was attended by the announcement of the demise of the greatest feline curiosity of the show in transit from Albuquerque, N. M., to make her appearance as a metropolitan star. The deceased was the hairless cat which had aroused great Interest among the exhibitors as the Aztec cat. The animal was regarded as something more than a curiosity, because of the antiquity attributed to its species, and it was stated by Dr. Cecil French of the Atlantic Cat Club that with the consent of the owner, T. J. Shinick, the hairless body would be presented to the Museum of Natural History here and may be offered in evidence that the cat had a part in Aztec as well us in Egyptian civilisation. The Aztec cat's misfortune gave opportunity for understudies, however, and a tame lynx and a tame ocelot now are rivals for the quarters that the hairless cat will not occupy.

According to the New-York Tribune, also of December 31, 1908, “Death, too, has invaded the exhibit, for the Mexican hairless cat died on the way to the scene of her expected triumph. This cat, which was the property of Miss. L. Spink, of Big Lake, Minnesota, is said to be the last of a famous Aztec race.” The owner's name appears to be an error.

In The Albuquerque Journal of December 29, 1928 (probably a reprint of an earlier article), it was reported, “T. J. Shinick, of this city, received a letter from Washington yesterday saying that the hairless cat, Nellie, which he sent to the national cat show, died of dropsy.” Dropsy is an accumulation of water in the soft tissues, which can be due to heart failure or, in cats, feline infectious peritonitis.

After that time, other randomly occurring hairless cats were also called (New) Mexican Hairless or Aztec cats. The term became generic instead of referring to the cats' location of origin. Charles Henry Lane reported in his book "Rabbits, Cats and Cavies" (1903) that a Mexican Hairless Cat called "Jesuit" belonged to the Hon. Mrs. McLaren Morrison (a notable cat breeder and collector of rarities). This was the only specimen Mr. Lane had seen, and he believed it to be the only one ever exhibited in England. A portrait of the cat was included in his book. Jesuit could have been the result of another random mutation, because Nellie was considered by her caretaker as being too valuable to travel.

The San Francisco Chronicle, May 11, 1919 reported: “Dr. Cecil French of Washington owned perhaps the strangest pet feline of all – a hairless Aztec cat. On account of the great difference in climatic conditions between Washington and Mexico, the home of this feline curiosity, Dr. French housed ‘Moko,’ as his Aztec pet was known, in a glass case with regulated temperature.” It doesn't give the date when Dr. French owned a hairless cat, but 1919 is a decade after Nellie's death.

Interest in the hairless cats of New Mexico was revived by Mr. H.C. Brooke in 1926. His queries were printed in The Albuquerque Journal of January 12, 1926 and The El Paso Herald (Texas) of March 15, 1926. Mr. Brooke's letter read: "They were obtained from some Indians, and that the Jesuit Fathers thought they were the last survivors of an ancient Aztec breed. Most unfortunately, Mr. Shinick didn’t mate the pair, because they were brother and sister, and apparently did not preserve the bodies on death."

Mr. Shinick's daughter, Mrs. Michael Palladino, replied in a letter to The Albuquerque Journal on January 14, 1926: According to Mrs. Palladino, her father had two of the hairless cats, a male and a female. He intended to mate them, but the male was stolen. The female he kept until she was about 13 years old, then sent her to the Smithsonian Institution in Washington. She died soon after arriving in Washington, and Mrs. Palladino said the body was mounted for display in the museum. Mrs. Palladino believed that was in December 1909. She did not know where her father obtained the cats.

The Montana Butte Standard, December 26, 1937 reported "Mexican hairless cats are supposedly extinct, a specimen is owned in New Mexico, says Mr. Crawford, and there may be others," but this claim was not substantiated.

On March 20, 1956, The Albuquerque Journal printed another request for information:

John White, head of the department of information of the state extension service and the Experiment Station at New Mexico A&M College, has a letter from an El Pasoan who wants information on what is called the Mexican, and sometimes New Mexico, hairless cat. White is stumped. So are the others in the department. The El Paso man first wrote to Mexico City College, Mexico City, for information. The college apparently told him the animal was mouse-colored and the underparts were pinkish. The animal also has a ridge of fur along the back and upper surface of the tail. Mexico City College advised the El Pasoan to write to New Mexico A&M. Many know of the Mexican hairless dog, but, says white, if anyone has seen a New Mexico Hairless cat, or knows there is such an animal, he’d like to hear about it.

Mrs. Palladino replied in The Albuquerque Journal, April 3, 1956 that her father, the late Thomas J. Shinick, had given her two hairless Mexican cats as pets in approximately 1894. She named them Dick and Nellie, and owned them for several years. One morning Dick didn't come home, and the family told her that the milkman had stolen him. When Nellie was about 15 years old, her father decided that because hairless cats were so rare, the Smithsonian Institution might be interested. Officials of the institution requested to see the cat Nellie. Mrs. Palladino said Nellie had arrived in Washington in good condition, but died a month later, after which she was exhibited as a taxidermy specimen.

This indicates that the Mexican Hairless, or Aztec, breed was a pair of hairless siblings given a fictionalized account of their origin and the romantic suggestion that they were the last of their breed. The term Mexican Hairless Cat became a generic term for any hairless cat until 1931 when hairless kittens were born to ordinary furred cats in France and were exhibited by Professor E. Letard.
