= GS-441524 =

Antiviral drug

Clinical data
- Trade names: NeoFipronis
- Other names: Pronidesivir

Legal status
- Legal status: AU: Yes; UK: Yes; US: Investigational drug; EU: No, legal treatment available in the Netherlands

Identifiers
- IUPAC name: (2R,3R,4S,5R)-2-(4-Aminopyrrolo[2,1-f][1,2,4]triazin-7-yl)-3,4-dihydroxy-5-(hydroxymethyl)oxolane-2-carbonitrile
- CAS Number: 1191237-69-0
- PubChem CID: 44468216
- DrugBank: DB15686
- ChemSpider: 28499294
- UNII: 1BQK176DT6
- KEGG: C22275
- ChEBI: CHEBI:147281
- ChEMBL: ChEMBL2016757
- ECHA InfoCard: 100.308.984

Chemical and physical data
- Formula: C_{12}H_{13}N_{5}O_{4}
- Molar mass: 291.267 g·mol^{−1}
- 3D model (JSmol): Interactive image
- SMILES: C1=C2C(=NC=NN2C(=C1)[C@]3([C@@H]([C@@H]([C@H](O3)CO)O)O)C#N)N
- InChI: InChI=1S/C12H13N5O4/c13-4-12(10(20)9(19)7(3-18)21-12)8-2-1-6-11(14)15-5-16-17(6)8/h1-2,5,7,9-10,18-20H,3H2,(H2,14,15,16)/t7-,9-,10-,12+/m1/s1; Key:BRDWIEOJOWJCLU-LTGWCKQJSA-N

GS-441524 is a nucleoside analogue antiviral drug which was developed by Gilead Sciences. It is the main plasma metabolite of the antiviral prodrug remdesivir, and has a half-life of around 24 hours in human patients. Remdesivir and GS-441524 were both found to be effective in vitro against feline coronavirus strains responsible for feline infectious peritonitis (FIP), a lethal systemic disease affecting domestic cats. Remdesivir was never tested in cats (though some vets now offer it), but GS-441524 has been found to be effective treatment for FIP.

It is widely used despite no official FDA approval due to Gilead's refusal to license this drug for veterinary use. In several countries oral GS-441524 tablets (and injectable remdesivir) became legally available to vets for the treatment of FIP in cats, for example Australia, the Netherlands, (Note: At the moment, legal treatment with GS-441524 in the Netherlands is only available through vets from the Veterinary medicine department of Utrecht University. The drug is made in the University pharmacy. After a successful trial period starting in June 2023, the drug became available under the drug name pronidesivir (NeoFipronis) for FIP treatment in cats to all vets in the country. Remdesivir can be legally used for treatment by all vets in the Netherlands under the cascade, since its approval for the use in human COVID-19 treatment.) and the United Kingdom.

Besides remdesivir, other prodrugs include obeldesivir (Gilead Sciences, Phase III) and deuremidevir (Vigonvita/Junshi, conditional approval in China).

== Use and research ==
=== Feline infectious peritonitis ===
Since untreated feline infectious peritonitis (FIP) is fatal in almost all cases and in most countries there are no approved treatments available, GS-441524 has reportedly been sold illegally worldwide on the black market and used by pet owners to treat affected cats, although Gilead Sciences has refused to license the drug for veterinary use. Its efficacy for this purpose has been conclusively demonstrated in multiple trials, including field trials, and even in more complicated forms of FIP such as those with multisystemic or neurological involvement. In naturally infected cats, a recovery rate of over 80% has been observed with GS-441524 treatment in several studies and in treatment programs in countries where the drug is legalised.

As of 2023, oral GS-441524 tablets or capsules (and injectable remdesivir) became legally available to vets for the treatment of FIP in cats in Australia, the Netherlands, and the United Kingdom. As of June 2024, the medication is available in the U.S.

=== COVID-19 ===
GS-441524 is either similar to or more potent than remdesivir against SARS-CoV-2 in cell culture, with some researchers arguing that GS-441524 would be better than remdesivir for the treatment of COVID-19. Specific advantages cited include ease of synthesis, lower kidney and hepatotoxicity, as well as potential for oral delivery (which is precluded of remdesivir because of poor hepatic stability and first pass metabolism). The public health advocacy group, Public Citizen, in an open letter urged the DHHS and Gilead to investigate GS-441524 for the treatment of COVID-19, suggesting that Gilead was not doing so for financial motives related to the longer intellectual property lifespan of remdesivir, whose patents expire no sooner than 2035. Direct efficacy against SARS-CoV-2 was demonstrated in a mouse model of COVID-19.

GS-441524 has been directly administered in a healthy human, with highest plasma concentrations of 12 uM reached, which is >10 times the concentration required for activity against SARS-CoV-2 in culture.

=== U.S. regulations ===
GS-441524 is sold as a research chemical in very high purity (>99% by NMR and HPLC) by a number of suppliers. Such sales for research purposes do not constitute patent infringements which was affirmed by a U.S. Supreme Court decision. However, despite the high purity, under FDA regulations, such chemicals are not allowed for clinical trials since their manufacture is not performed under FDA cGMP certified conditions.

=== Deuremidevir ===
A deuterium modified version of GS-441524 has been produced and has shown pre-clinical efficacy in both cell culture and mouse models by a team including members of Wuhan Institute of Virology. A subsidiary of Shanghai Junshi Biosciences received conditional approval for VV116, now named deuremidevir, to treat adults with COVID-19 from China's National Medical Products Administration on January 30, 2023.

== Pharmacology ==
=== Pharmacodynamics ===
GS-441524 nucleoside is phosphorylated by nucleoside kinases (probably adenosine kinase (ADK), which is the enzyme that phosphorylates the structurally similar ribavirin), and then phosphorylated again by nucleoside-diphosphate kinase (NDK) to the active nucleotide triphosphate form. The triphosphate of GS-441524, GS-443902, is also the bioactive anti-viral agent generated by remdesivir, but is generated by a different biochemical mechanism from the later.

=== Pharmacokinetics ===
GS-441524 is a 1'-cyano-substituted adenosine analogue. It is remdesivir's predominant metabolite circulating in the serum due to rapid hydrolysis (half life less than 1 hour) followed by dephosphorylation.

In response to the letter from Public Citizen, National Institutes of Health's drug discovery arm, National Center for Advancing Translational Sciences (NCATS), has started systematic Investigational New Drug enabling experiments including pharmacokinetics in multiple pre-clinical species, and also (in October) in humans (results not yet published). Oral bioavailability was found to be excellent in dogs, good in mice, but modest in cynomolgus non-human primates. Prediction of human oral bioavailability from pre-clinical data is more art than science, and relies on modeling data from multiple species. Taking as reference point the clinical and pre-clinical data of other nucleoside analogues, human oral bioavailability of GS-441524 is expected to fall somewhere in between that seen in dog as a high point and that seen in non-human primates. Since GS-441524 has a bit less than half the molecular weight of remdesivir, it will deliver as much active metabolite to the blood as the same dose of remdesivir (for example, 100 mg), even if human oral bioavailability is 50%, comparable to (for example) ribavirin. More recent data releases from NCATS shows that GS-441524 is tolerated at 1000 mg/kg in dogs with a maximum plasma concentration (C_{max}) of nearly 100 μM, or about 100-fold higher than the concentrations required for activity against the virus in cell culture.

The elimination half-life of GS-441524 is around 2 hours in cynomolgus, much shorter than the 24 hours reported in humans. The longer half life suggests once-a-day dosing if the drug is approved for human oral use.

=== Mechanism of action ===
Intracellular triple-phosphorylation of GS-441524 yields its active 1'-cyano-substituted adenosine triphosphate analogue, which directly disrupts viral RNA replication by competing with endogenous NTPs for incorporation into nascent viral RNA transcripts and triggering delayed chain termination of RNA-dependent RNA polymerase.

=== Tolerance ===
In vitro experiments in Crandell Rees feline kidney (CRFK) cells found GS-441524 was nontoxic at 100 μM concentrations, 100 times the dose effective at inhibiting FIPV replication in cultured CRFK cells and infected macrophages. Clinical trials in cats indicate the drug is well-tolerated, with the primary side effect being dermal irritation from the acidity of the injection mix.

Some researchers suggesting its utility as a treatment for COVID-19 have pointed out advantages over remdesivir, including lack of on-target liver toxicity, longer half-life and exposure (AUC) and much cheaper and simpler synthesis.

== See also ==
- CMX521
- NITD008
