= EICAR (antiviral) =

Chemical compound

Clinical data
- Other names: 5-Ethynyl-1-β-D-ribofuranosylimidazole-4-carboxamide

Legal status
- Legal status: US: Investigational New Drug

Identifiers
- IUPAC name: 1-[(3R,4S,5R)-3,4-Dihydroxy-5-(hydroxymethyl)oxolan-2-yl]-5-ethynylimidazole-4-carboxamide
- CAS Number: 118908-07-9
- PubChem CID: 21120184
- ChemSpider: 399153
- CompTox Dashboard (EPA): DTXSID50922809

Chemical and physical data
- Formula: C_{11}H_{13}N_{3}O_{5}
- Molar mass: 267.241 g·mol^{−1}
- 3D model (JSmol): Interactive image
- SMILES: NC(=O)c1ncn(c1C#C)C2[C@H](O)[C@H](O)[C@H](O2)CO
- InChI: InChI=1S/C11H13N3O5/c1-2-5-7(10(12)18)13-4-14(5)11-9(17)8(16)6(3-15)19-11/h1,4,6,8-9,11,15-17H,3H2,(H2,12,18)/t6-,8-,9-,11?/m1/s1; Key:SWQQELWGJDXCFT-ABHRNEANSA-N

EICAR (5-ethynyl-1-β-D-ribofuranosylimidazole-4-carboxamide) is a nucleoside analogue which has both anti-cancer and antiviral effects, and was originally developed for the treatment of leukemia, but was unsuccessful in human clinical trials. It has broad spectrum antiviral effects with activity against pox viruses, Semliki forest virus, Junin virus, reovirus, influenza, measles virus and respiratory syncytial virus among others, although it is not active against coronaviridae such as SARS-CoV-1. This useful spectrum of activity means that EICAR and related derivatives continue to be investigated for the treatment of viral diseases.

EICAR was originally discovered as a potent inhibitor of the human enzyme IMP dehydrogenase, part of the guanylate biosynthesis pathway. This activity is responsible for its known anticancer and antiviral effects.

== See also ==
- ETAR
