= John R. Mascola =

American Physician-Scientist

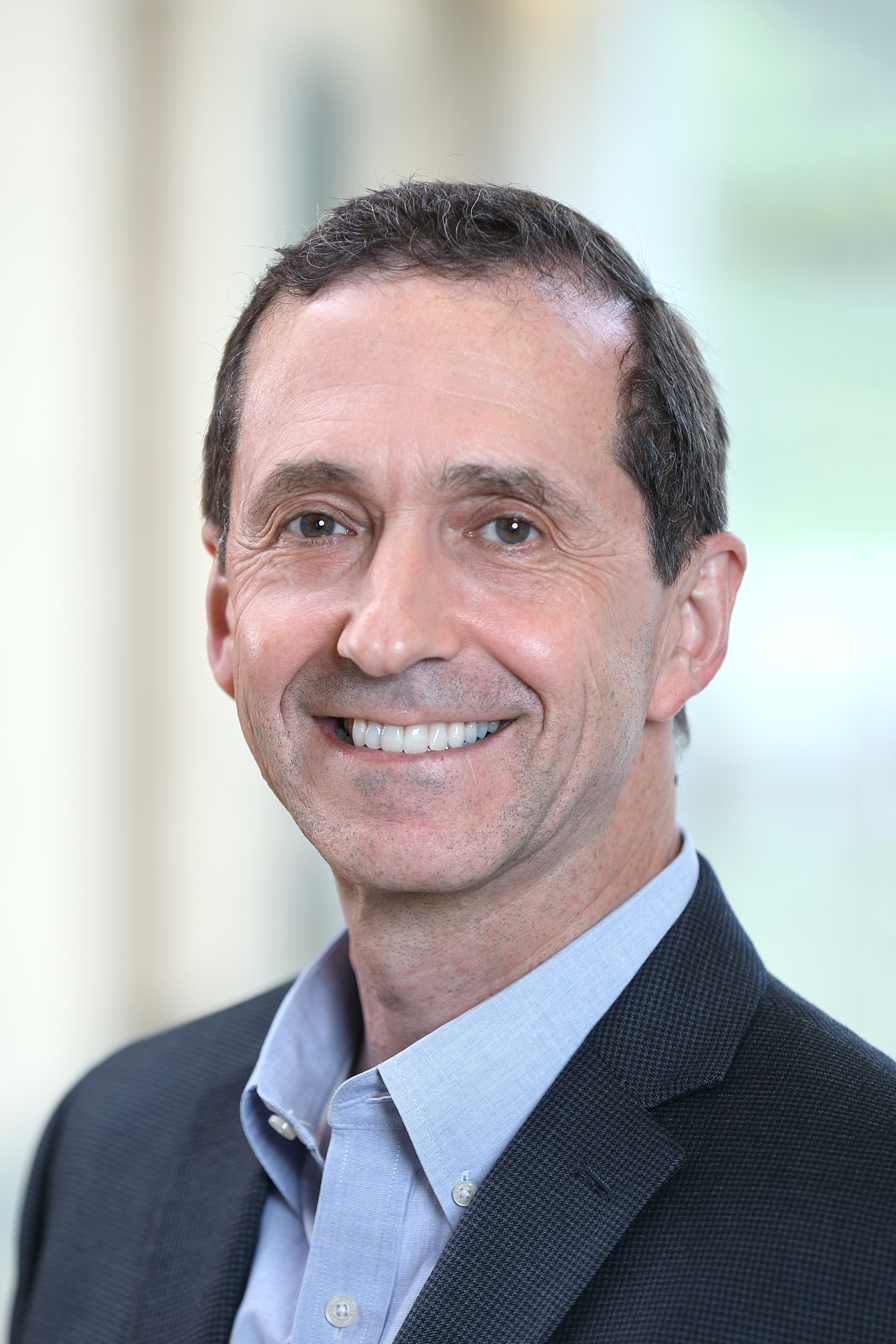
- John R. Mascola, M.D.

Director of the Vaccine Research Center
- Deputy: Julie E. Ledgerwood; Richard A. Koup
- Scientific career
- Fields: Immunology; Virology
- Institutions: National Institutes of Health, National Institute of Allergy and Infectious Diseases, Vaccine Research Center

John R. Mascola is an American physician-scientist, immunologist and infectious disease specialist. He was the director of the Vaccine Research Center (VRC), part of the National Institute of Allergy and Infectious Diseases (NIAID), National Institutes of Health (NIH). He also served as a principal advisor to Anthony Fauci, director of NIAID, on vaccines and biomedical research affairs. Mascola is the current Chief Scientific Officer for ModeX Therapeutics.

Mascola is an internationally recognized expert in vaccine and antibody-based product development who has led biomedical research efforts targeting a broad range of viral pathogens for more than 30 years.

As part of the United States Government COVID-19 Response, Mascola led the Vaccine Development Team (VDT) of Operation Warp Speed facilitating the rapid development, evaluation, and subsequent authorization of effective COVID-19 vaccines.

== Education ==
Mascola graduated from Tufts University in 1981 with a Bachelor of Science degree and earned his medical degree from Georgetown University School of Medicine in 1985. He completed a residency in internal medicine at the Naval Medical Center, San Diego and a fellowship in infectious diseases at the National Naval Medical Center, Bethesda, MD, followed by a fellowship in retroviral diseases at the Walter Reed Army Institute of Research (WRAIR). Mascola completed board-certification in internal medicine and infectious diseases.

== Career ==
=== Early Biomedical Research ===
Mascola began his career in biomedical research as a U.S. Navy physician. Upon completion of his medical training, he served as a Staff Research Physician in the Division of Retrovirology, WRAIR from 1993 – 2000. During this time, Mascola advanced multiple studies of HIV immunology and vaccine development. His research demonstrated the importance of neutralizing antibodies in protection against HIV and helped explain the reason that HIV vaccines have not yet been effective.

=== Leading the Vaccine Research Center ===
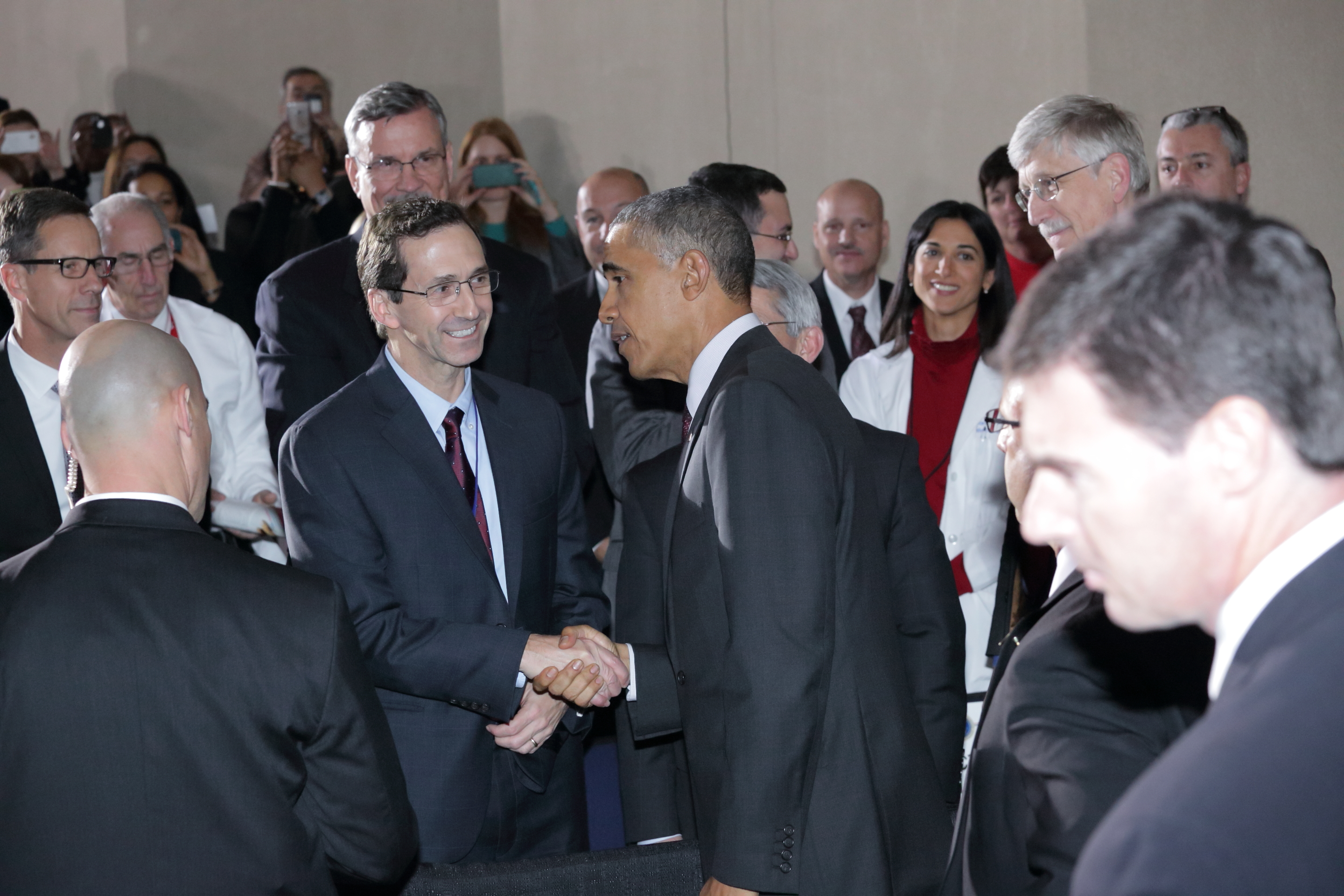
Mascola greets President Barack Obama in 2014

Mascola joined the Vaccine Research Center (VRC) in 2000 as a founding investigator and Principal Deputy Director. In this role, he worked with the Center’s founding director, Gary Nabel, to build a broad research portfolio, including the capacity of the Center to develop and evaluate new vaccines and antibody products.

Mascola was appointed Director of the VRC in 2013 and provided leadership to the scientific and clinical research activities of the Center, guiding development of vaccine and antibody-based research programs for diseases of high public health importance. Scientific advances and research include the isolation, characterization and advanced development of antibodies targeting HIV, Ebola and COVID-19, the clinical evaluation of novel vaccine candidates and biologic products targeting respiratory syncytial virus (RSV), influenza, Malaria, and Zika, among others, and strategic collaboration with pharmaceutical and biotech partners advancing VRC products into effective public health interventions.

=== Novel Vaccine and Antibody-Based Product Research ===
Mascola’s laboratory research focused on rational design approaches to produce effective vaccine and antibody products to prevent and treat infectious diseases. His laboratory also studies how the immune system generates protective antibody responses against viruses and other infectious pathogens.

In 2010, Dr. Mascola and colleagues discovered an antibody called VRC01 that potently neutralizes the HIV virus. Over the course of a decade, the VRC developed this and more potent antibodies to understand their potential to prevent and treat HIV infection. Investigators at the VRC also discovered an antibody against Ebola, and during the 2018 outbreak in the Democratic Republic of Congo (DRC), this antibody, called mAb114, was shown to dramatically reduce mortality of Ebola virus disease. mAb114 has been developed by Ridgeback Biotherapeutics and licensed for use by the FDA. Other major vaccines and antibodies under development include those for RSV, chikungunya virus and improved vaccines for Influenza.

=== Response to COVID-19 ===
Mascola and his colleague Barney Graham led the partnerships between the VRC and Moderna to design and develop a successful mRNA vaccine that became mRNA-1273, authorized for use (EUA) in December 2020 and with AbCellera and Eli Lilly to isolate a SARS-CoV-2 monoclonal antibodies Ly-CoV555 (bamlanivimab) authorized for use in November 2020 and bebtelovimab authorized for use in February 2022.

Mascola helped establish and lead the Operation Warp Speed Vaccine Development Team (VDT), responsible for coordinating the effort to develop and evaluate the COVID-19 vaccines selected within the US Government portfolio. He also serves as senior member on both NIH and HHS leadership teams that provided recommendations on COVID-19 variants of concern, vaccine boosters and heterologous vaccine platforms.

== Professional societies ==
2002: American Society for Clinical Investigation (ASCI)

2012: Association of American Physicians (AAP)

2014: Fellow, American Academy of Microbiology (AAM)

2017: Elected, National Academy of Medicine (NAM)

== Selected awards ==
2020: Washingtonian Magazine Washingtonians of the Year

2021: NIH Director’s Award for Outstanding Efforts in the Pursuit of Effective Vaccines and Therapeutics to COVID-19
