= Oklahoma State University Center for Health Sciences =

Medical school in Tulsa, Oklahoma, U.S.

- Former names: Oklahoma College of Osteopathic Medicine and Surgery, OSU College of Osteopathic Medicine
- Type: Public medical school
- Established: 1972
- Parent institution: Oklahoma State University System
- Endowment: $1.562 billion (2021)
- Budget: $268.1 million (OSU-CHS)
- President: Johnny Stephens
- Provost: Jeffery Stroup
- Academic staff: 95 (full time); 611 (part time)
- Doctoral students: 365
- Location: Tulsa, Oklahoma, United States; 36.138°N 96.006°W
- Campus: Metropolitan, 16 acres
- Colors: Orange and Black
- Website: medicine.okstate.edu

Oklahoma State University Center for Health Sciences (OSU-CHS) is a public medical school in Tulsa, Oklahoma, United States. It also has a branch campus in Tahlequah, Oklahoma. Founded in 1972, OSU-CHS is part of the Oklahoma State University System. OSU-CHS offers a Doctor of Osteopathic Medicine (D.O.) and over fifteen other different graduate degrees.

== History ==
OSU-CHS was founded in 1972 as the Oklahoma College of Osteopathic Medicine and Surgery. It was renamed as the OSU College of Osteopathic Medicine when it became part of the OSU System in 1988. In the spring of 2006, the College of Osteopathic Medicine signed an academic affiliation agreement with Tulsa Regional Medical Center to create a permanent teaching hospital for Oklahoma State students. As of November 2, 2006, Tulsa Regional Medical Center was rechristened as the Oklahoma State University Medical Center, as per the terms of the 50-year agreement. Oklahoma legislators appropriated $40 million in funding towards improving the hospital's technology and facilities. Among the expected improvements are an expansion of the intensive care unit and renovations to the women's health and neonatal intensive care unit programs. OSU Medical Center is the largest osteopathic teaching center in the United States, training 165 resident physicians in primary and sub-specialty care each year.

OSU-CHS includes the College of Osteopathic Medicine, the School of Biomedical Sciences, the School of Forensic Sciences, the School of Healthcare Administration, and the School of Allied Health.

The Center for Health Sciences has conducted research into the condition known as Morgellons, for which there is no known etiology or treatment.

Dr. Edward Goljan is the most well-known faculty member at the school. He is the professor and chair of pathology, and is nationally recognized as an expert educator in medical board exam preparation. Dr. Goljan is author of the popular "Rapid Review" book for pathology, and audio files of his lectures are used by medical students around the country.

== Academics ==
OSU-CHS offers a Doctor of Osteopathic Medicine degree. The first and second years of medical school at OSU focus on the basic sciences, and are primarily classroom based. Courses include biochemistry, immunology, microbiology, pharmacology, and osteopathic manipulative medicine. The third and fourth years of medical training are clinically oriented, consisting of clinical clerkships, where students rotate through various specialties of medicine. These rotations, which provide opportunities for students to develop clinical skills, include: internal medicine, family medicine, surgery, OB/GYN, pediatrics, psychiatry, and osteopathic manipulative medicine.

Osteopathic medical students at OSU may choose to complete an additional degree to the DO degree. Combined degree programs include: Doctor of Philosophy (PhD), Master of Science, Master of Business Administration, and Master of Public Health (MPH).

OSU-CHS also offers master's degrees in physician assistant studies, health care administration, global health, forensic science, biomedical science and athletic training.

In 2021, several OSU-CHS healthcare programs were highly ranked by U.S. News & World Report in its 2022 rankings. The institution was ranked seventh in health shortage areas and tenth in rural care. Its primary care program was ranked 42nd in primary care production and 13th in diversity.

=== Accreditation ===
OSU-CHS is accredited by the American Osteopathic Association's Commission on Osteopathic College Accreditation.

== Second campus ==
The Oklahoma State University Center for Health Sciences opened the OSU College of Osteopathic Medicine at the Cherokee Nation in Tahlequah, Oklahoma. Classes commenced in the fall of 2020. This is the first Native American tribally-affiliated medical school in the United States, graduating its first class in May of 2024.

== Notable alumni ==
- Julie Ledgerwood, Chief of clinical trials program at Vaccine Research Center of National Institute of Allergy and Infectious Diseases
