= Nancy Sullivan (biologist) =

American cell biologist

Nancy J. Sullivan
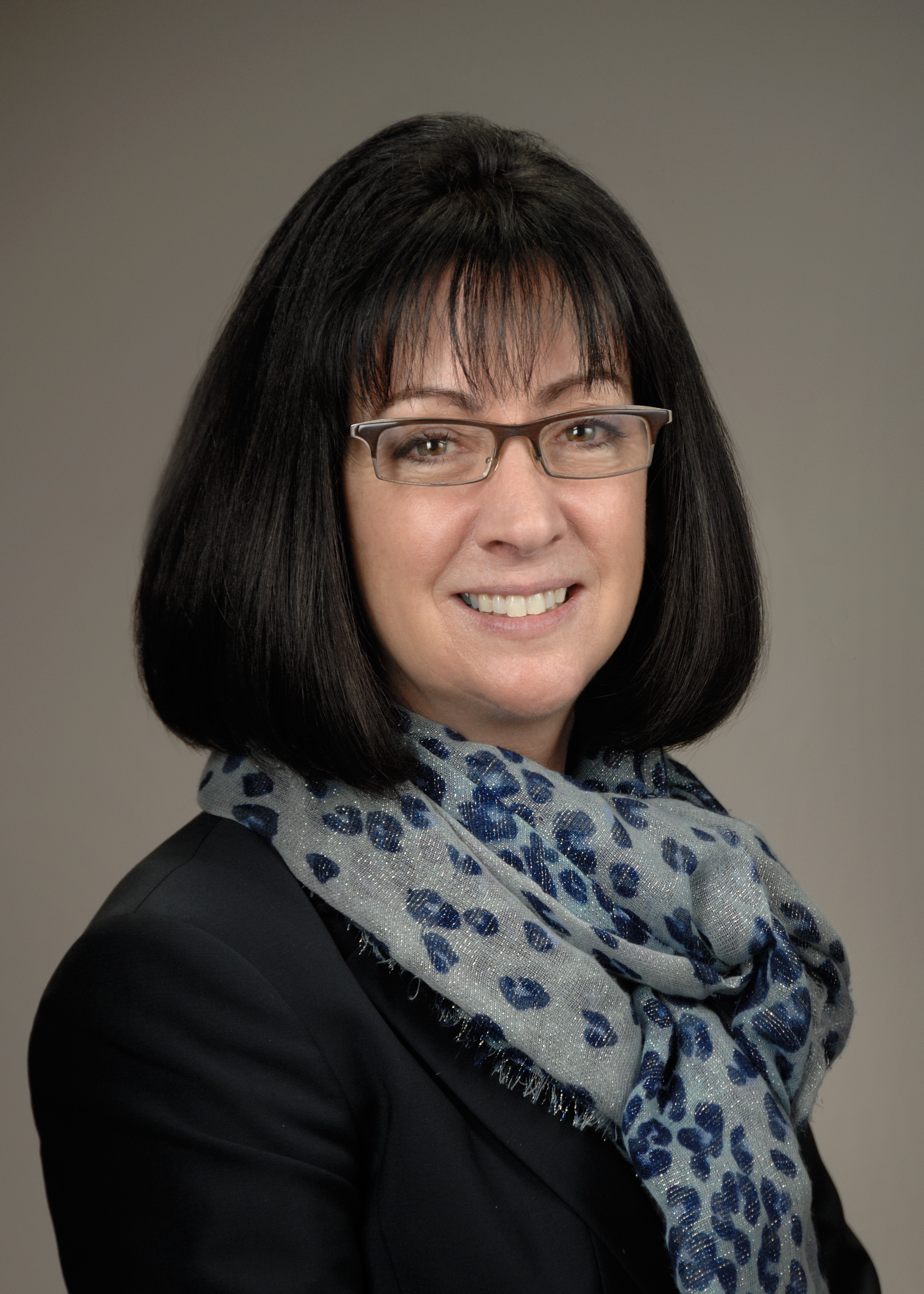
- Sullivan in 2015
- Born: Nancy Jean Sullivan
- Education: Harvard T.H. Chan School of Public Health (ScD, MS) Merrimack College (BS)
- Known for: Viral immunology, vaccine development, filovirus biology
- Scientific career
- Fields: Cell biology, Virology, Immunology
- Workplaces: National Emerging Infectious Diseases Laboratories (NEIDL) at Boston University
- Thesis: Determinants of HIV-1 envelope glycoprotein-mediated fusion and antibody neutralization (1997)
- Doctoral advisor: Joseph Sodroski
- Website: https://www.bu.edu/neidl/profile/nancy-j-sullivan/

Nancy Jean Sullivan is an American cell biologist, virologist, and immunologist. She served as director of the National Emerging Infectious Diseases Laboratories (NEIDL) at Boston University from December 2022 to May 2025. She remains a member of BU's Biology and Medical Faculty. She is former chief of the Biodefense Research Section at the Vaccine Research Center (VRC) in the National Institute of Allergy and Infectious Diseases (NIAID).

Sullivan was awarded the 2020 Science, Technology, and Environment Service to America Medal for the development of ansuvimab, an FDA-approved monoclonal antibody for the treatment of Ebola virus disease.

In 2014, Time magazine recognized Sullivan's scientific work in the development of vaccines among other health-care workers and scientists tackling the Ebola viral outbreak in West Africa as its Person of the Year. Sullivan was a finalist for the 2020 Samuel J. Heyman Service to America Medal in the Science, Technology and Environment category for her work developing mAb114.

== Education ==
Sullivan completed a Doctor of Science from Harvard T.H. Chan School of Public Health in 1997. She conducted a dissertation in the laboratory of Joseph Sodroski, where her work demonstrated that primary HIV isolates exhibit resistance to antibody neutralization due to occlusion of the co-receptor binding site on the envelope glycoprotein GP120. Sullivan then pursued postdoctoral training under Gary Nabel, studying the mechanisms of Ebola virus pathogenesis and immune protection.

== Career ==
=== Research ===
Sullivan's research is on the immunologic correlates and mechanisms of protection against infection by hemorrhagic fever viruses including Ebola virus. Her work on filovirus immunology and vaccine development was despite the difficulties of conducting research under highly specialized BSL-4 containment conditions.

Sullivan's research on Ebola led to discovery of both vaccines and therapies. Sullivan and her team demonstrated vaccine protection against Ebola infection in primates through gene-based prime-boost vaccine. This was followed by her discovery of a single shot vaccine that provided immediate protection. This vaccination schedule is now standard in the field of Ebola vaccine research, where one of the lead Ebola vaccine candidates, ChAd3-EBOV, has been advanced to Phase I/II and III human clinical trials. Sullivan and her team have also discovered a protective monoclonal antibody, mAb114, from a human Ebola survivor that rescues Ebola-infected primates, even when given as a monotherapy several days after their Ebola exposure.

Sullivan's work on the SARS-CoV-2 Omicron variant demonstrated that the strain produces attenuated disease and milder respiratory tract pathology in animal samples compared to earlier variants. Sullivan's work on non-Ebola filoviruses, including the Bundibugyo, Sudan, and Marburg viruses, advocates for establishing global medical countermeasures and diagnostic capacity prior to the emergence of rare pathogen outbreaks.
