= Nicole Doria-Rose =

American biologist

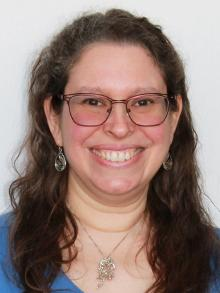
- Doria-Rose in 2021
- Born: 1970 (age 55–56)
- Education: Cornell University (BA, PhD)
- Scientific career
- Fields: Humoral immunity
- Workplaces: Vaccine Research Center
- Thesis: In vivo selection of Rous sarcoma virus mutants with randomized sequences in the packaging signal (1998)
- Doctoral advisor: Volker Vogt

Nicole Amy Doria-Rose (born 1970) is an American biologist. She is chief of the humoral immunology core at the Vaccine Research Center. She develops and applies assays to evaluate HIV-1 specific antibody responses during natural infection and after immunization.

== Education ==
Doria-Rose graduated from Hunter College High School in New York City in 1987. She obtained her Bachelor of Arts in biology in 1991 and a Ph.D. in 1998 from Cornell University. During her doctoral studies, she trained under advisor Volker Vogt in the department of biochemistry, molecular and cell biology. Her dissertation was titled In vivo selection of Rous sarcoma virus mutants with randomized sequences in the packaging signal.

From 1998 to 2003, Doria-Rose worked as a postdoctoral scientist in the laboratory of Nancy Haigwood at the Seattle Biomedical Research Institute (SBRI) and the department of pathobiology at University of Washington. Doria-Rose was promoted to the position of associate scientist at SBRI in 2003. While working as a post-doctoral fellow, Doria-Rose was also appointed as associate faculty in the science department at Shoreline Community College in 2000.

== Career ==
Doria-Rose joined the National Institute of Allergy and Infectious Diseases in 2006 as a senior research fellow in the laboratory of immunoregulation. In 2011, she became a staff scientist at the Vaccine Research Center, where she has worked on isolating new, potent anti-HIV monoclonal antibodies and studying their development over time. In 2012, she was promoted to the position of Chief of the humoral immunology core.

Doria-Rose develops and applies assays to evaluate HIV-1 specific antibody responses during natural infection and after immunization.
