= Promomed =

Russian pharmaceutical company

- Company type: Limited liability company
- Industry: Pharmaceutical; Biotechnology
- Founded: 2005; 20 years ago in Moscow
- Founders: Petr Bely
- Headquarters: Moscow, Russia
- Area served: Russia & Worldwide
- Key people: Petr Bely (CEO)
- Products: Pharmaceutical drugs
- Website: promomed.ru/en/ >

Promomed Group is a Russian pharmaceutical company specialising in elaboration, production, check studies and distribution of medicinal drugs. Its major production site, the Biokhimik Plant, is in Saransk.

== History ==
The Promomed Group was established in 2005. It was planned, from the outset, that the company would be carrying out clinical trials as well as exercising promotional marketing of pharmaceuticals made to order. as its first pharmaceutical drug.

In 2007, the company launched Reduxin, a drug to treat obesity.

In 2012, the Promomed Group, in cooperation with National Medical Research Center for Endocrinology (Russia) and Russian Association of Endocrinologists, initiated a world's largest observational study that covered 100 000 patients and 3 000 doctors in 142 locations around Russia.

In 2015, Promomed acquired the Biokhimik plant; that same year an updated work unit got underway at the plant, to produce lozenges and capsules.

Still in 2017 and for the first time in Russia, full-cycle production, from a strain variant to the finished product, of an antibiotic substance, Vancomycin, was developed and put in working order.

In 2018, the Company opened its Representative office in Vietnam.

In 2020, Promomed Group obtained approval for production and marketing of areplivir, a drug developed on the basis of favipiravir molecule for the treatment of COVID-19. That same year, the Company placed its bonds on the Moscow Exchange, with a total value of 1 billion rubles (next placements in 2021 - 5 billion rubles and in 2022 - 2,5 billion rubles).

In February 2022, Ministry of Health of the Russian Federation granted marketing authorisation, to Promomed, for Esperavir, a drug based on molnupiravir and developed for the treatment of COVID-19.

In April 2022, Ministry of Health of the Russian Federation approved yet another medication produced by Promomed, an anti-COVID drug, Skyvira.

In 2023, Promomed Group bought a controlling stake in pharmaceutical company Berakhim.

In June 2023, at the time of the 26th St. Petersburg International Economic Forum, an agreement between the Government of Moscow and the Promomed Group was signed, respectively, by Vladislav Ovchinsky, Head of the Investments and Industries Policy Department of the Government of Moscow, and Petr Bely, Chair of the Board of Directors of the Promomed Group, on the establishment of a research centre at the Pechatniki site and of a facility for manufacturing of biotechnological products at the Alabushevo site, of the Technopolis Moscow Special Economic Zone (SEZ).

== Activities ==
Promomed Group is engaged in production of endocrinological, rheumatological, neurological, antiviral, antibacterial, antitumor and other types of drugs.

The company's portfolio contained over 180 various names of drugs in 2021 and 80 percent of them were on the official List of vital medicines (the list of medicines approved by the Government of the Russian Federation for the purpose of state regulation of prices for medicines). By 2023, the portfolio expanded up to 250 names of drugs while the share of vital medicines in it remained at 80 percen.

=== Manufacture ===
The Group produces medicines at a large Biochemist enterprise in Saransk. A small part of the drugs (including areplivir) were also produced in 2021 at the facilities of Ozon LLC.

In summer of 2023, the Promomed Group signed an agreement with the Government of Moscow to establish production of cutting-edge pharmaceuticals, including drugs under import substitution industrialisation policy, within the framework of the Technopolis Moscow Special Economic Zone (SEZ). Its experimental production unit is expected to make about 250 thousand medicine bottles a year, at its initial stage.

== ESG ==
The Group has adopted its own ESG strategy and it is being implemented. In October 2022, Promomed Group published its first ever ESG report (environmental, social, and corporate governance).

== General owners and Chief executives ==
Petr Bely — founder and principal shareholder of Promomed Group, chair of the board of directors.

== Sponsorship ==
In 1994, with the support of today's subsidiary Promomed, JSC Biokhimik, the Biokhimik-Mordovia football club was created, which existed until 2004 and in 2005 was transformed into the FC Mordovia Saransk.
