= Molnupiravir =

Antiviral medication

Clinical data
- Pronunciation: /ˌmɔːlnuˈpɪərəvɪər/ MAWL-noo-PEER-ə-veer
- Trade names: Lagevrio
- Other names: MK-4482, EIDD-2801
- AHFS/Drugs.com: Monograph
- MedlinePlus: a622027
- License data: US DailyMed: Molnupiravir
- Pregnancy category: AU: D; Not recommended
- Routes of administration: By mouth
- ATC code: J05AB18 (WHO)

Legal status
- Legal status: AU: S4 (Prescription only); BR: Class C1 (Other controlled substances); UK: POM (Prescription only); US: ℞-only via emergency use authorization

Identifiers
- IUPAC name: N-Hydroxy-5'-O-isobutyryl-3,4-dihydrocytidine [(2R,3S,4R,5R)-3,4-Dihydroxy-5-[4-(hydroxyamino)-2-oxopyrimidin-1-yl]oxolan-2-yl]methyl 2-methylpropanoate (PIN)
- CAS Number: 2492423-29-5
- PubChem CID: 145996610
- DrugBank: DB15661
- ChemSpider: 84400552
- UNII: YA84KI1VEW
- KEGG: D11943
- ChEBI: CHEBI:180653
- ChEMBL: ChEMBL4650320
- CompTox Dashboard (EPA): DTXSID501028058
- ECHA InfoCard: 100.310.497

Chemical and physical data
- Formula: C_{13}H_{19}N_{3}O_{7}
- Molar mass: 329.309 g·mol^{−1}
- 3D model (JSmol): Interactive image
- SMILES: CC(C)C(=O)OC[C@H]1O[C@@H](n2ccc(NO)nc2=O)[C@H](O)[C@@H]1O
- InChI: InChI=1S/C13H19N3O7/c1-6(2)12(19)22-5-7-9(17)10(18)11(23-7)16-4-3-8(15-21)14-13(16)20/h3-4,6-7,9-11,17-18,21H,5H2,1-2H3,(H,14,15,20)/t7-,9-,10-,11-/m1/s1; Key:HTNPEHXGEKVIHG-QCNRFFRDSA-N

Molnupiravir, sold under the brand name Lagevrio, is an antiviral medication that inhibits the replication of certain RNA viruses. It is used to treat COVID‑19 in those infected by SARS-CoV-2. It is taken by mouth.

Molnupiravir is a prodrug of the synthetic nucleoside derivative N^{4}-hydroxycytidine and exerts its antiviral action by introducing copying errors during viral RNA replication.

Molnupiravir was originally developed to treat influenza at Emory University by the university's drug innovation company, Drug Innovation Ventures at Emory (DRIVE), but was reportedly abandoned for mutagenicity concerns. It was then acquired by the Miami-based company Ridgeback Biotherapeutics, which later partnered with Merck & Co. to develop the drug further.

Based on positive results in placebo-controlled double-blind randomized clinical trials, molnupiravir was approved for medical use in the United Kingdom in November 2021. In December 2021, the US Food and Drug Administration (FDA) granted an emergency use authorization (EUA) to molnupiravir for use in certain populations where other treatments are not feasible. The emergency use authorization was only narrowly approved (13–10) because of questions about efficacy and concerns that molnupiravir's mutagenic effects could create new variants that evade immunity and prolong the COVID‑19 pandemic. In September 2023, molnupiravir's viral mutagenicity was confirmed to contribute to circulating SARS-CoV-2 genomic variation in a study of global SARS CoV 2 isolates after 2022: molnupiravir-specific genomic changes were more common, especially where molnupiravir had been used.

== Medical uses ==
In the UK, molnupiravir is indicated for treatment of mild to moderate COVID‑19 in adults with a positive SARS-COV-2 diagnostic test and who have at least one risk factor for developing severe illness.

In the US molnupiravir is unapproved but is authorized under an EUA for emergency use for the treatment of adults with mild-to-moderate COVID‑19 who are at high risk for progression to severe COVID‑19, including hospitalization or death, and for whom alternative COVID‑19 treatment options approved or authorized by FDA are not accessible or clinically appropriate.

Molnupiravir also shows potential antiviral activity against Middle East respiratory syndrome coronavirus (MERS-CoV), influenza virus, respiratory syncytial virus (RSV), bovine viral diarrhea virus (BVDV), hepatitis C virus (HCV), Ebola virus (EBOV), feline coronavirus (FCoV) and enteroviruses.

== Contraindications ==
Use during pregnancy is not recommended. There are no human data on use during pregnancy to assess the risk of adverse maternal or fetal outcomes. Based on animal data, the drug may cause fetal harm.

== Adverse effects ==
Adverse reactions observed in the phase III MOVe-OUT study included diarrhea (2%), nausea (1%) and dizziness (1%), all of which were mild or moderate.

The US FDA prescription label contains a boxed warning.

In rats, bone and cartilage toxicity was observed after repeated dosing.

== Overdose ==
The effects of overdose are unknown, treatment consists of general supportive measures such as monitoring of clinical status.

== Drug interactions ==
Based on limited available data, there are no drug interactions.

== Mechanism of action ==
Molnupiravir inhibits viral reproduction by promoting widespread mutations in the replication of viral RNA by RNA-directed RNA polymerase. It is metabolized into a ribonucleoside analog that resembles cytidine, β-D-N^{4}-hydroxycytidine 5′-triphosphate (also called EIDD-1931 5′-triphosphate or NHC-TP). During replication, the virus's enzyme incorporates NHC-TP into newly made RNA instead of using real cytidine.

Molnupiravir is turned into NHC-TP, the active form.

Molnupiravir can swap between two forms (tautomers), one of which mimics cytidine (C) and the other uridine (U). NHC-TP is not recognized as an error by the virus's proofreading exonuclease enzymes, which can replace mutated nucleotides with corrected versions. When the viral RNA polymerase attempts to copy RNA containing molnupiravir, it sometimes interprets it as C and sometimes as U. This causes more mutations in all downstream copies than the virus can survive, an effect called viral error catastrophe or lethal mutagenesis.

Molnupiravir mimicking C and U.

Molnupiravir N-hydroxylamine mimics C and pairs with G.

Molnupiravir oxime mimics U and pairs with A.

The wiggly lines stand for the connection to the pentose sugar and point in the direction of the minor groove.

== Chemistry ==
The first synthesis of molnupiravir was disclosed in a patent filed by Emory University in 2018.

In the first step, acetone is used as a protecting group to render two of the three hydroxy groups of uridine unreactive to treatment with the acid anhydride of isobutyric acid, which converts the third hydroxy group to its ester. Treatment with 1,2,4-triazole and phosphoryl chloride produces a reactive intermediate in which the triazole portion can be replaced with hydroxylamine. Finally, removal of the protecting group using formic acid converts the material to molnupiravir.

== History ==
Molnupiravir was developed at Emory University by its drug innovation company, Drug Innovation Ventures at Emory (DRIVE). In 2014, DRIVE began a screening project funded by the Defense Threat Reduction Agency to find an antiviral drug targeting Venezuelan equine encephalitis virus (VEEV), which led to the discovery of EIDD-1931. When turned into the prodrug EIDD-2801 (molnupiravir), the compound also showed activity against other RNA viruses including influenza, Ebola, chikungunya, and various coronaviruses.

The international nonproprietary name of the drug was inspired by that of Thor's hammer, Mjölnir. The idea is that the drug will strike down the virus like a mighty blow from the god of thunder.

In 2019, the National Institute of Allergy and Infectious Diseases (NIAID) approved moving molnupiravir into Phase I clinical trials for influenza.

In March 2020, the research team pivoted to studying SARS-CoV-2, and successfully used molnupiravir to treat human cells infected with the novel coronavirus. A study found that it is orally active against SARS-CoV-2 in ferrets.

DRIVE then licensed molnupiravir for human clinical studies to Miami-based company Ridgeback Biotherapeutics, which later partnered with Merck & Co. to develop the drug further.

The primary data supporting the US Food and Drug Administration (FDA) emergency use authorization for molnupiravir are from MOVe-OUT, a randomized, double-blind, placebo-controlled clinical trial studying molnupiravir for the treatment of non-hospitalized participants with mild to moderate COVID‑19 at high risk for progression to severe COVID‑19 and/or hospitalization. Participants were adults 18 and older with a pre-specified chronic medical condition or at increased risk of SARS-CoV-2 infection for other reasons who had not received a COVID‑19 vaccine. The main outcome measured in the trial was the percentage of people who were hospitalized or died due to any cause during 29 days of follow-up. Of the 709 people who received molnupiravir, 6.8% were hospitalized or died within this period compared to 9.7% of the 699 people who received a placebo.

In November 2022, the British National Institute for Health and Care Excellence decided molnupiravir should not be routinely used to treat COVID‑19, as research showed it made no significant difference to hospitalization or death rates and was not cost effective. The drug was added to its "not recommended" list in draft COVID‑19 treatment guidance for consultation.

== Society and culture ==
=== Economics ===
In September 2021, Merck signed a voluntary licensing agreement with the Medicines Patent Pool (MPP) that allows MPP to sublicense molnupiravir and supply the COVID‑19 oral medication to 105 low- and middle-income countries. The cost of the US government's initial purchase was about $712 per course of treatment; treatment with generics in developing countries can cost as little as $20.

Sales of molnupiravir were $952 million in the fourth quarter of 2021.

=== Legal status ===
In October 2021, Merck submitted an EUA application to the FDA, and in November 2021, the FDA's Antimicrobial Drugs Advisory Committee (AMDAC) at the Center for Drug Evaluation and Research met to discuss the application. The committee narrowly voted, 13 for and 10 opposed, to recommend authorization for adults with mild to moderate illness who are at high risk of developing severe COVID‑19. Concerns were expressed over the drug's low effectiveness in preventing death, which in the final trial was only 30%, as well as the increased mutation rate the drug causes, which could theoretically worsen the pandemic by driving the evolution of more dangerous variants. In December 2021, the US Food and Drug Administration (FDA) issued an emergency use authorization (EUA) for molnupiravir for the treatment of mild-to-moderate COVID‑19 in adults with positive results of direct SARS-CoV-2 viral testing who are at high risk for progression to severe COVID‑19, including hospitalization or death, and for whom alternative COVID‑19 treatment options authorized by the FDA are not accessible or clinically appropriate.

In October 2021, the Committee for Medicinal Products for Human Use of the European Medicines Agency (EMA) started a rolling review of molnupiravir. In February 2023, the EMA recommended the refusal of the marketing authorization for molnupiravir. In June 2023, Merck Sharp & Dohme withdrew its application for a marketing authorization of molnupiravir.

In November 2021, molnupiravir was approved in the UK by the Medicines and Healthcare products Regulatory Agency (MHRA) for the treatment of established infections of COVID‑19. The MHRA issued a conditional marketing authorization applicable in the UK, and an emergency use authorization for Northern Ireland.

In November 2021, the Bangladesh Directorate General of Drug Administration (DGDA) authorized emergency use of molnupiravir.

In January 2022, molnupiravir was approved for medical use in Israel and in February 2022 in Russia.

=== Brand names ===
Molnupiravir is the international nonproprietary name.

Generic versions are available under the brand names Molulife (Mankind), Molena (Emcure), and Esplevir (Promomed).

=== Public health concerns ===
At a November 2021 AMDAC meeting, multiple advisors raised the concern that molnupiravir could accelerate the emergence of variants of concern. Other scientists raised similar concerns both before and after the meeting. These concerns were confirmed with the September 2023 publication of a study of 15 million global SARS-CoV-2 sequences: after molnupiravir had been introduced in 2022, genomic changes were more common, especially where it had been used.

== Research ==
Alternative patented routes to molnupiravir have been reviewed.

Clinical findings vary on the efficacy of molnupiravir in reducing COVID-19 severity. Some studies indicate a reduction in hospitalizations, deaths, and viral load, while others show no significant benefit, particularly in vaccinated populations.
