= Atoltivimab =

Pharmaceutical drug

Monoclonal antibody
- Type: Whole antibody
- Source: Human
- Target: Zaire ebolavirus glycoprotein

Clinical data
- Pronunciation: a" tol tiv' i mab
- License data: US DailyMed: Atoltivimab
- Drug class: Monoclonal antibody
- ATC code: None

Identifiers
- CAS Number: 2135632-29-8
- UNII: FJZ07Q63VY
- KEGG: D11468

Chemical and physical data
- Formula: C_{6448}H_{9954}N_{1726}O_{2002}S_{44}
- Molar mass: 145097.28 g·mol^{−1}

Atoltivimab is a Zaire ebolavirus glycoprotein-directed human monoclonal antibody that is part of the fixed-dose combination atoltivimab/maftivimab/odesivimab that is used for the treatment of Zaire ebolavirus (Ebola virus).
