= Maftivimab =

Pharmaceutical drug

Monoclonal antibody
- Type: Whole antibody
- Source: Human
- Target: Zaire ebolavirus glycoprotein

Clinical data
- Pronunciation: maf tiv' i mab
- License data: US DailyMed: Maftivimab
- Drug class: Monoclonal antibody
- ATC code: None

Identifiers
- CAS Number: 2135632-36-7
- DrugBank: DB15899
- UNII: KOP95331M4
- KEGG: D11450
- ChEMBL: ChEMBL4298184

Chemical and physical data
- Formula: C_{6368}H_{9886}N_{1706}O_{2008}S_{46}
- Molar mass: 143947.83 g·mol^{−1}

Maftivimab is a Zaire ebolavirus glycoprotein-directed human monoclonal antibody that is part of the fixed-dose combination atoltivimab/maftivimab/odesivimab that is used for the treatment of Zaire ebolavirus (Ebola virus).
