= Oklahoma State University Medical Center =

Teaching hospital in Tulsa, Oklahoma, U.S.

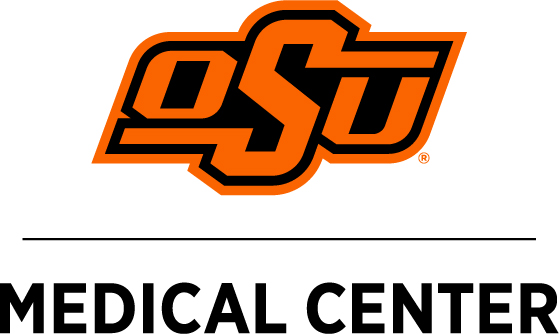

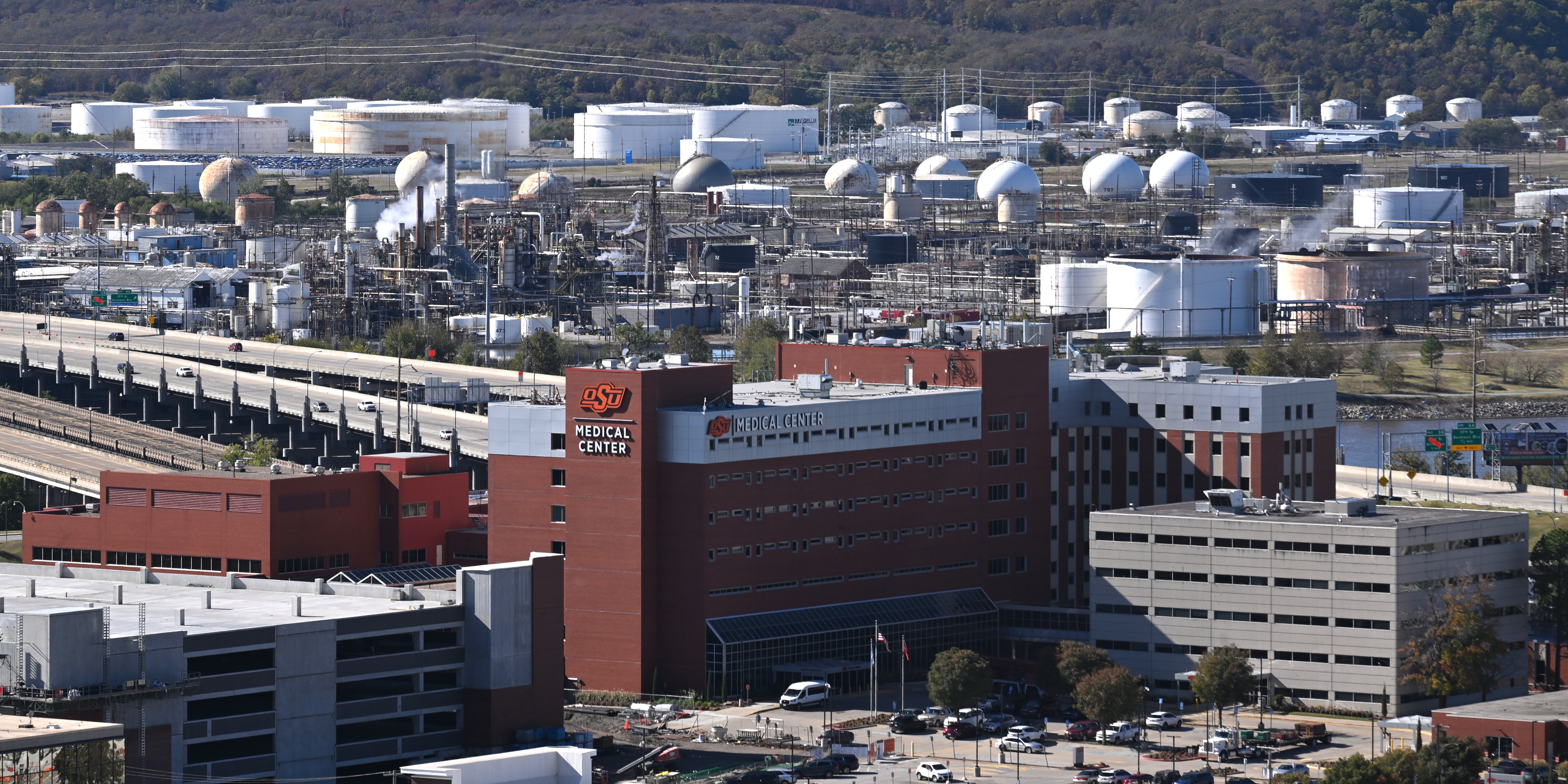

Geography
- Location: 744 W 9th St, Tulsa, Oklahoma, U.S.
- Coordinates: 36°08′48″N 96°00′00″W

Organisation
- Type: Teaching
- Affiliated university: Oklahoma State University Center for Health Sciences

Services
- Emergency department: Level 3 trauma center
- Beds: 195

History
- Former names: Oklahoma Osteopathic Hospital; Tulsa Regional Medical Center
- Founded: 1943

Links
- Website: www.osumc.com
- Lists: Hospitals in U.S.

Oklahoma State University Medical Center (OSU Medical Center) is a public teaching hospital with medical clinics located in Tulsa, Oklahoma, United States. OSU medical center operates a large number of osteopathic residency and fellowship programs. The hospital is the largest osteopathic teaching center in the United States, training 135 resident physicians in primary and sub-specialty care each year.

The hospital is accredited by the Healthcare Facilities Accreditation Program. The emergency department at OSU Medical Center, which includes a level 3 trauma center, receives about 45,000 visits per year. Oklahoma legislators have appropriated $40 million in funding towards improving the hospital's technology and facilities. Among the expected improvements are an expansion of the intensive care unit and renovations to the women's health and neonatal intensive care unit programs.

== History ==
Founded in 1943, OSU Medical Center was established as the Oklahoma Osteopathic Hospital by a group of osteopathic physicians who purchased a building previously used a psychiatric hospital. The hospital name was later changed to Tulsa Regional Medical Center. In 1996, the non-profit hospital was bought by Columbia/HCA of Nashville, Tennessee, who changed made the facility into a for-profit hospital. The company later became the target of a federal fraud investigation, which eventually pleaded guilty and paid $1.7 billion in fines. In 1999, the hospital was sold to Tulsa-based Hillcrest Medical Center, a locally owned non-profit organization, which already owned another hospital in Tulsa.

In 2004, the for-profit Ardent Health Services, also of Nashville, bought the Hillcrest system. In 2006, the hospital changed its name to OSU Medical Center, as the State of Oklahoma passed Senate Bill 1771, which provided $40 million to fund improvements at the hospital. The city formed a trust to take over the hospital, which was threatened with closure by lack of funds. In 2009, Ardent Health Services agreed to mediation terms, where Ardent would donate the hospital to the State of Oklahoma in exchange for $10 million in reimbursement for indirect medical education costs.

In January 2021, plans were announced to build a 58-bed medical-surgical veteran's administration (VA) hospital on OSU Medical Center's campus.

== Services ==
OSU Medical Center has a partnership with OSU Center for Health Sciences and Diagnostic Imaging Associates to provide medical care to rural communities in Oklahoma with a telemedicine program. This program currently includes 35 regional hospital and clinic partners, and is one of the largest statewide telemedicine programs in the United States.

OSU Medical Center also provides cardiology care, comprehensive wound care, and child, adolescent, and geriatric psychiatric care. The hospital operates the only hyperbaric oxygen chamber in the region. OSU Medical Center recently expanded its cardiology services and uses Cardiology of Tulsa to oversee its cardiology fellowship program.

The hospital is accredited by the Healthcare Facilities Accreditation Program.

== Graduate medical education ==
OSU Medical Center operates several training programs for physicians, including 11 residency programs and 9 fellowship programs, which provide training for 135 residents and interns. Residency programs include family medicine, internal medicine, pediatrics, emergency medicine, anesthesiology, diagnostic radiology, general surgery, obstetrics and gynecology, orthopedic surgery and ophthalmology. Fellowship programs include cardiology (heart), oncology (cancer), and nephrology (kidney).
