= Odesivimab =

Pharmaceutical drug

Monoclonal antibody
- Type: Whole antibody
- Source: Human
- Target: Zaire ebolavirus glycoprotein

Clinical data
- Pronunciation: oh" de siv' i mab
- License data: US DailyMed: Odesivimab
- Drug class: Monoclonal antibody
- ATC code: None

Identifiers
- CAS Number: 2135632-30-1
- UNII: UY9LQ8P6HW
- KEGG: D11921

Chemical and physical data
- Formula: C_{6506}H_{10024}N_{1720}O_{2030}S_{42}
- Molar mass: 146164.29 g·mol^{−1}

Odesivimab is a Zaire ebolavirus glycoprotein-directed human monoclonal antibody that is part of the fixed-dose combination atoltivimab/maftivimab/odesivimab that is used for the treatment of Zaire ebolavirus (Ebola virus).
