= Jean-Jacques Muyembe-Tamfum =

Virologist known for working with Ebola

Jean-Jacques Muyembe
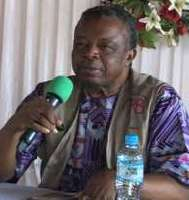
- Born: Jean-Jacques Muyembe-Tamfum
- Education: Lovanium University; Université Catholique de Louvain (PhD)
- Known for: Ebola discovery, prevention & treatment
- Awards: Nature's 10 (2019); Hideyo Noguchi Africa Prize (2019); Royal Society Africa Prize (2015)
- Scientific career
- Workplaces: Democratic Republic of the Congo; National Institute for Biomedical Research
- Thesis: Mode d'action des inducteurs d'interferon non-viraux dans une infection virale de la souris (1973)

Jean-Jacques Muyembe is a Congolese microbiologist. He is the general director of Institut National pour la Recherche Biomedicale of DR Congo. He was part of team at the Yambuku Catholic Mission Hospital that investigated the first Ebola outbreak, and was part of the effort that discovered Ebola as a new disease. In 2016, he led the research that designed, along with other researchers at the INRB and the National Institute of Health Vaccine Research Center in the US, one of the most promising treatment for Ebola, mAb114. The treatment was successfully tested during recent outbreaks in the DRC, on the express decision of the then DRC Minister of Health, Dr Oly Ilunga, despite advice against this from the World Health Organization.

== Early life and education ==
Muyembe grew up in Bandundu Province, the child of farmers. He was educated in schools run by the Catholic Jesuit order. He studied medicine, starting in 1962, at Lovanium University in Léopoldville (now Kinshasa) and graduated in 1969, there he became interested in microbiology. He earned a PhD in virology at the University of Leuven in Belgium, working on viral infections with mouse models. He returned to Zaire (another former name of the Democratic Republic of the Congo) in 1973 and worked in the cholera outbreak control. In 1974 there was a cholera outbreak in Matadi, which was the first crisis that Muyembe worked on.

== Career ==
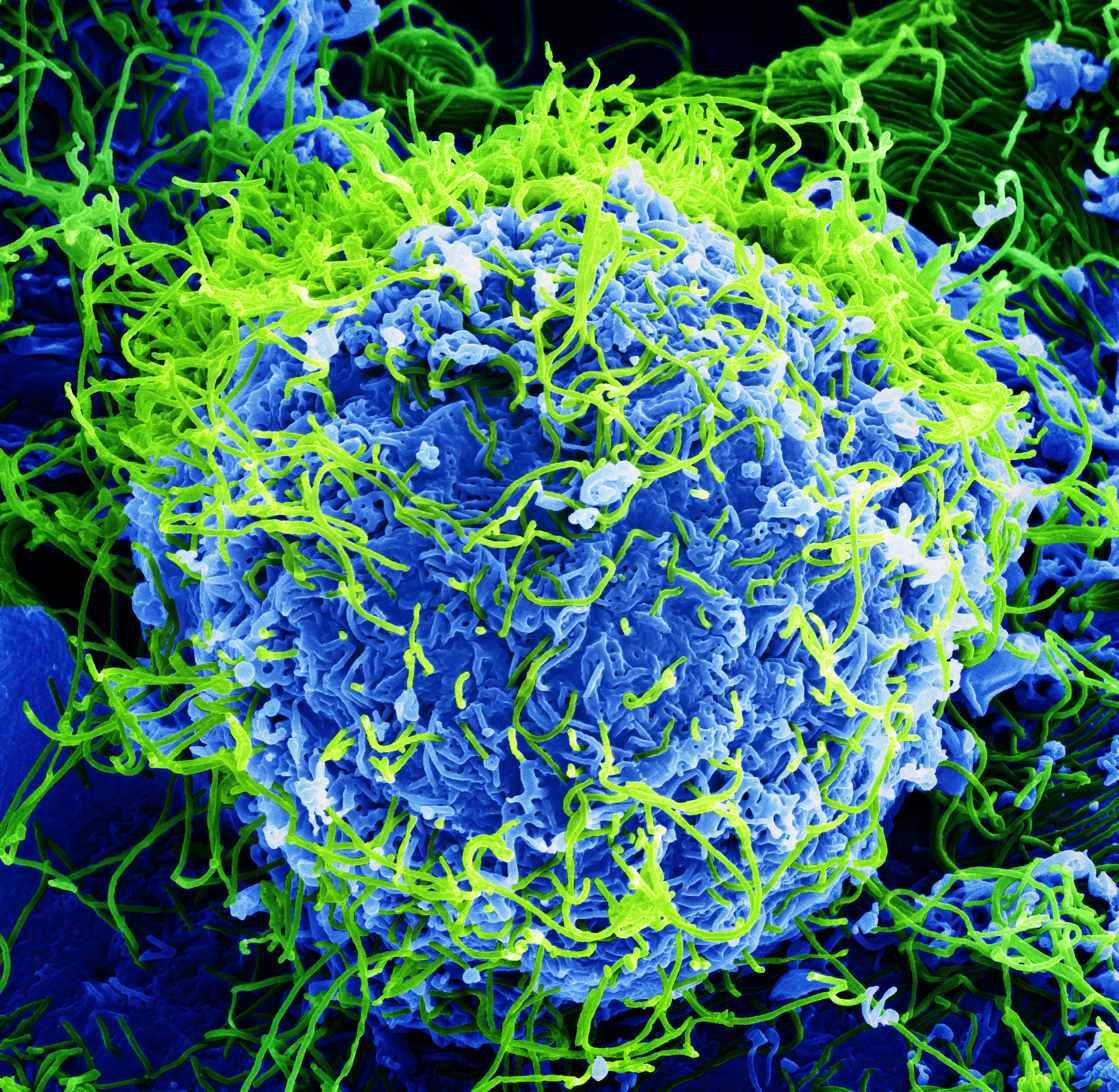
Scanning electron micrograph of the Ebola virus in an African green monkey kidney cell

Muyembe was described by The Lancet as Africa's Ebola hunter. He first came across the Ebola virus in 1976 at a Belgian hospital in Yambuku. Muyembe took liver biopsies from three nuns who had died, but the results were inconclusive. He was the first scientist to come into contact with the virus and survive. Muyembe has been described as one of the discoverers of Ebola due to his work in the 1976 outbreak. He took the blood of a sick nurse, which was sent for analysis at the Institute for Tropical Medicine in Antwerp, then to the Centers for Disease Control and Prevention, where Peter Piot used the sample to discover Ebola. That version of events, regarding his role in the 1976 outbreak, was later refuted in a 2016 scientific article he co-signed with some of the remaining actors of that first epidemic.

He was appointed dean of the University of Kinshasa Medical School in 1978. In 1981 Muyembe joined the Institut Pasteur de Dakar in Senegal, working with the Centers for Disease Control and Prevention to study the Ebola and Marburg viruses. In 1998 he was made the director of the Democratic Republic of the Congo National Institute for Biomedical Research.

He has acted as an adviser to the World Health Organization Emergency Committee on Ebola. Here he leads 15 researchers studying sleeping sickness, bas-Congo virus and the Ebola. He has advised political leadership in West Africa.

He recognised the sociocultural challenges of Ebola, encouraging hospitals to improve their infection control and community engagement. He worked with David L. Heymann on the Ebola outbreak in 1995. He was called by the director of the Kikwit General Hospital who was asking for help with an outbreak of deadly diarrhea. When Muyembe arrived, he recognised it was Ebola, and sent samples for confirmation at the Centers for Disease Control and Prevention. He has chaired the international committees that looked to control the Ebola outbreaks in Gabon and the Democratic Republic of the Congo (DRC). He leads research into the reservoirs of the Ebola virus in the DRC. In 2009, he demonstrated that the Ebola outbreaks in the DRC were due to fruit bat exposure. He has developed an anti-Ebola serum therapy which, using antibodies from convalescent patients, was first tried by another medical team during the 1976 outbreak in Yambuku and subsequently recommended for future outbreaks by the International Commission set up by the Government of DRC (formerly Zaïre). In 2014, he was appointed by Director General Margaret Chan to the WHO Advisory Group on the Ebola Virus Disease Response, co-chaired by Sam Zaramba and David L. Heymann.

There was a further Ebola outbreak in 2018, which took time to control due to delays in reporting. The Wellcome Trust and Department for International Development donated £1 million each. He pioneered the use of an experimental Ebola vaccine during the outbreak to limit the spread of the virus, including vaccinating health professionals. That position on the use of experimental drugs during outbreaks stirred some heated debate in the DRC, with Dr Oly Ilunga eventually resigning from his position as the Minister of Health, citing undue pressure and interference from unnamed multinational pharmaceutical firms.

Muyembe has established multiple research facilities, including a polio and influenza lab. In 2017 he partnered with the Japan International Cooperation Agency to build a research complex with several biosafety labs. As of 2018 the DRC did not have any labs to test for Ebola.

He is globally known leader in the fight against Ebola and is a key figure in the World Health Organization efforts to combat infectious diseases. He is co-discoverer of the Ebola virus in 1976 and co-inventor of the monoclonal antibody " mAb114", approved by FDA as an Ebola treatment under the name "Ebanga" in December 2020.

On April 3, 2020, during a press conference in Kinshasa, Muyembe advocated for the trial in DRC of experimental vaccines against the COVID-19 virus in the midst of a major pandemic, generating a serious backlash from the Congolese population; he eventually backtracked, saying that there had been a misunderstanding.

== Awards and honours ==
In 2015, he was awarded the Christophe Mérieux Prize to study further research in the Congo Basin. That year he was awarded the Royal Society Africa Prize for his seminal work on viral haemorrhagic fevers, including Ebola, generating the foundation of our understanding of the epidemiology, clinical manifestations and control of outbreaks of these viral infections. He was presented with the Lifetime Achievement Award at the 2015 International Symposium on Filoviruses. He was named as one of Nature's 10 in 2018 and 2019. In 2019 he won the Hideyo Noguchi Africa Prize from the Government of Japan. Muyembe was included in Time's 100 Most Influential People of 2020. In 2022, Harvard University awarded him an honorary Doctor of Science degree. He was awarded 2023 WHO Director General's Global Leaders Awards as a distinguished scientist and public health leader who was closely involved in the discovery of Ebola before advancing to leadership positions in global health. The award honours his lifetime achievements in public health. On 27 June 2026, he was promoted to the rank of Commander of the National Order of the Leopard, one of the DR Congo's highest national honours.
