= Julie Ledgerwood =

American allergist and immunologist

Julie E. Ledgerwood
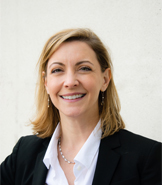
- Ledgerwood, c. 2016
- Education: Phillips University; Oklahoma State University Center for Health Sciences
- Known for: Chief Medical Officer and Chief of the Clinical Trials Program at NIAID; Led the first human trial to test the Ebola vaccine
- Scientific career
- Fields: Osteopathic Medicine; Immunology
- Workplaces: National Institute of Allergy and Infectious Diseases

Julie E. Ledgerwood is an American allergist and immunologist, who is the chief medical officer and chief of the Clinical Trials Program at the Vaccine Research Center (VRC) of the National Institute of Allergy and Infectious Diseases (NIAID), part of the National Institutes of Health in Bethesda, Maryland. She is a Doctor of Osteopathic Medicine.

Ledgerwood leads clinical trials and clinical collaborations for the VRC; and has served as principal investigator, protocol chair, or associate investigator for over 60 Phase 1-2b clinical trials studying vaccines and monoclonal antibodies targeting pathogens such as HIV, influenza, Ebola, malaria, Chikungunya, and Zika in over 13 countries. She led the first human trial aimed at testing a vaccine for Ebola virus and the first evaluation of mAb114, a monoclonal antibody targeting Ebola.

For the past 15 years, she has conducted research with numerous academic research teams and has led international vaccine research collaborations. Ledgerwood has authored textbook chapters and over 85 publications in peer-reviewed journals.

== Education ==
Ledgerwood graduated from Phillips University in Enid, Oklahoma and received her Doctor of Osteopathic Medicine degree from the College of Osteopathic Medicine at Oklahoma State University Center for Health Sciences.

== Career ==
From 1999 to 2002, Ledgerwood completed her medical residency in internal medicine at Johns Hopkins Bayview Medical Center in Baltimore, Maryland. In 2002, Ledgerwood joined NIAID as a clinical fellow in allergy and immunology. In 2003, she joined the VRC as a clinical investigator. Ledgerwood is board certified by the American Board of Allergy and Immunology.

Her work has been covered extensively in lay and scientific media outlets, including NBC News, Politico, The Guardian, NPR, and The New York Times.
