= Barney S. Graham =

American immunologist (born 1953)

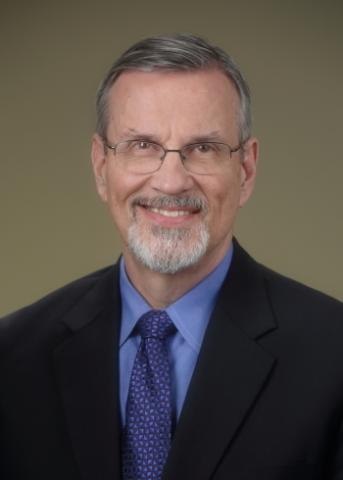
- Born: 1953 (age 72–73); Kansas City, Missouri
- Spouse(s): Cynthia Turner-Graham, M.D.
- Children: 3

Academic background
- Education: B.S., biology, Rice University; M.D., 1979, University of Kansas School of Medicine; Ph.D., Microbiology and Immunology, 1991, Vanderbilt University

Academic work
- Institutions: Vaccine Research Center; National Institutes of Health; Vanderbilt University

Barney S. Graham is an American immunologist, virologist, and clinical trials physician.

He is currently Professor of Medicine and Microbiology, Biochemistry, & Immunology and Senior Advisor for Global Health Equity at Morehouse School of Medicine in Atlanta. He is the former deputy director of the Vaccine Research Center (VRC), part of the National Institute of Allergy and Infectious Diseases (NIAID), National Institutes of Health (NIH). During his tenure at the VRC, Graham also served as chief of the Viral Pathogenesis Laboratory.

He was elected a member of the National Academy of Sciences in 2022, and was elected a member of the National Academy of Medicine in 2025.

== Early life and education ==
Graham was born in Kansas City, Missouri, the first son of Barney Dan Graham, DDS and Carol Ann Hastings and spent most of his childhood in Olathe, Kansas through early high school. The family moved to a farm near Paola, Kansas, where he graduated from Paola High School as valedictorian in 1971. He attended college at Rice University and graduated magna cum laude in 1975 with a BA degree in biology. After earning his medical degree from the University of Kansas School of Medicine in 1979, Graham continued his training at Vanderbilt University where he completed his internship, residency, consecutive chief residencies at Nashville General Hospital and Vanderbilt University Medical Center, followed by infectious diseases fellowship, and a PhD in Microbiology and Immunology.

== Career ==
By 1982, Graham was appointed chief resident at Nashville General Hospital, where he treated Tennessee's first AIDS patient. Following this, he was named to a chief residency at Vanderbilt University Medical Center, where he led one of the first human trials of candidate AIDS vaccines. The results of the trial found that the two experimental AIDS vaccines proved to yield the best immune response in patients. During his time at Vanderbilt, Graham was working simultaneously on his Ph.D. in microbiology.

Graham was elected a member of the American Society for Clinical Investigation in 1996. In 2000, the National Institutes of Health (NIH) recruited him to create a vaccine evaluation clinic (Vaccine Research Center), but he insisted on maintaining a research laboratory to focus on vaccines for three categories of respiratory viruses. During the 2015–2016 Zika virus epidemic, Graham and Ted Pierson, chief of the Laboratory of Viral Diseases, collaborated to create a vaccine intended to prevent the Zika virus. Moving from inception to manufacturing in just three months, they began a Phase 2 clinical trial in March 2017 to measure its effectiveness. In recognition of their efforts, they were finalists for the 2018 Promising Innovations Medal.

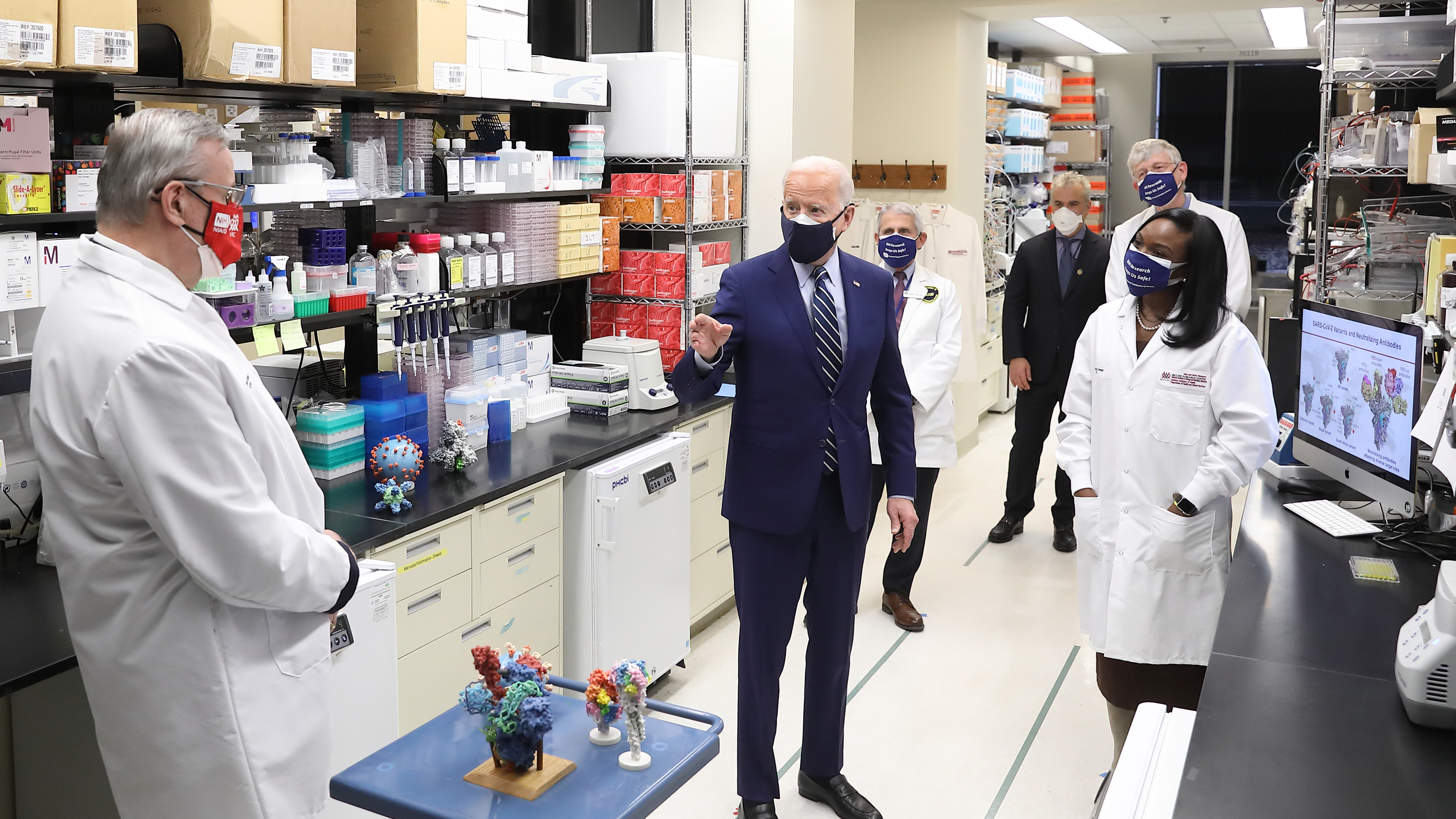

By 2017, working alongside Jason McLellan, a structural biologist, they discovered that "adding two prolines to a key joint of a vaccine's spike protein could stabilize the structure's prefusion shape" (patent WO2018081318A1). Later, this method would be applied to the COVID-19 vaccine. During the COVID-19 pandemic, Graham's laboratory partnered with Moderna to develop vaccine technology. He was a member of the research team that designed a spike protein to combat the virus. He also participated in the NIH's Accelerating COVID-19 Therapeutics and Vaccines (ACTIV) initiative as a member of its TRACE Working Group.

Graham's research found that some virus proteins change shape after they break into a person's cells, leading to the design of a better vaccine against respiratory syncytial virus. In 2021 he received the Albany Medical Center Prize, and in 2022 he was awarded the John J. Carty Award for the Advancement of Science of the NAS. Graham was named in the 2024 Time 100 most influential people in health list and in 2025 he was inducted into the National Inventors Hall of Fame.

== Personal life ==
Graham is married to Cynthia Turner-Graham, also a physician. She specializes in psychiatry. They have three children.
