= Institut National pour la Recherche Biomedicale =

Government medical research center in Kinshasa, Democratic Republic of the Congo

Coordinates: 4.3108°S 15.3031°E

Institut National de la Recherche Biomédicale
- INRB
- Established: 1984
- Research type: National medical research institute
- Director: Jean-Jacques Muyembe-Tamfum
- Location: Avenue de la Démocratie (formerly Avenue des Huileries), BP 1197, Kinshasa-Gombe, Kinshasa, Democratic Republic of the Congo
- Affiliations: Ministry of Scientific Research and Technology (DRC); Ministry of Health (DRC); World Health Organization Collaborating Centre (since 2018)

The Institut National de la Recherche Biomédicale (INRB) is the national medical research organization of the Democratic Republic of the Congo. The responsible ministry is the Ministry of Scientific Research and Technology.

The National Biomedical Research Institute (INRB) was founded in 1984. It is a 70,000 m² establishment. It has been a collaborating center of the World Health Organization since 2018, headed by Professor Jean-Jacques Muyembe-Tamfum, MD, PhD, and serving as a national biomedical research laboratory for the Ministry of Health of the Democratic Republic of Congo (DRC). It is a multidisciplinary institute which collectively has hundreds of years of experience in the identification, treatment and prevention of diseases in the DRC. Its foundations are the performance of medical and biological analyzes, applied and translational research, surveillance of communicable diseases and the promotion of professional growth and development. The INRB has continuously developed and trained high-quality researchers and produced exceptional results. More recently, it has made concrete efforts in terms of control, prevention, and research in response to the current Ebola epidemic.

It has brought it's expertise to the government of the DRC in the areas of disease surveillance, prevention and intervention. In 30 years of existence, the INRB has quickly become recognized worldwide and has played an essential role in tropical health research.

The establishment is a modern, structured research institute composed of six laboratories dedicated to Virology, Parasitology, Bacteriology, Medical Entomology, Clinical Biology and Pathology, including a Research Center for animals and a data center. Each laboratory is made up of a dedicated director and staff, including students and international collaborators. Each laboratory has the basic equipment and the space necessary for optimal research. It is available to faculty, students, post-docs and staff from the periphery of the INRB. Due to the structure of the INRB, if sharing and access to individual laboratory equipment is required, access is granted at the request and approval of the directors of these laboratories. The INRB common area includes some major equipment. All collaborators and researchers have, upon request, access to several -80 freezers, liquid nitrogen tanks, centrifuges, water baths, tissue homogenizers, vortexes, incubators, agitators, and all laboratories have access to cold chain equipment such as dry shippers and portable freezers.

The INRB was founded in 1984 and has been a World Health Organization collaborating centre since 2018. The INRB and the World Health Organization have worked closely together on research into the effectiveness of the ring vaccination strategy during the 2018 Kivu Ebola outbreak.

The National Biomedical Research Institute (INRB) has eight dynamic departments, which participate in the institute's various missions, namely monitoring, research, and training. The departments work in inter-collaboration on several research themes. Each department has qualified staff and state-of-the-art infrastructure.

Below is the list of the institute's departments:

- Pathology Laboratory
- Clinical Biology Laboratory
- Virology Laboratory
- Parasitology Laboratory
- Clinical Microbiology Laboratory
- Immunology Unit
- Data Center
- Administration

The INRB is based at Avenue de la Démocratie (formerly Avenue des Huileries), BP 1197, Kinshasa-Gombe, DRC.
