= Vaccine Research Center =

Division of the National Institute of Allergy and Infectious Diseases

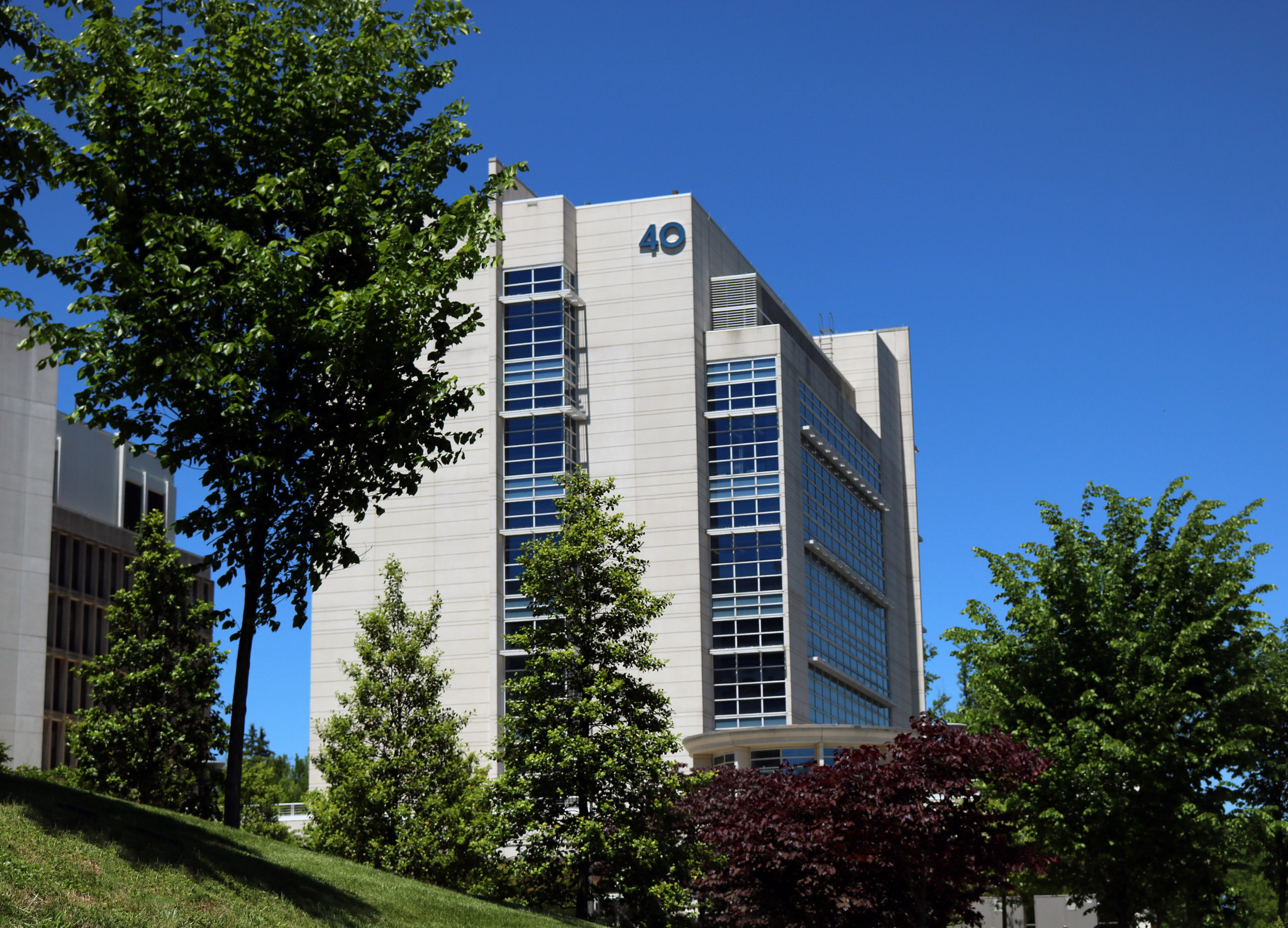
- Headquarters of Dale and Betty Bumpers Vaccine Research Center in Bethesda, Maryland, United States

Agency overview
- Formed: 1997; 29 years ago
- Agency executive: John R. Mascola
- Parent department: National Institute of Allergy and Infectious Diseases
- Parent agency: National Institutes of Health
- Website: www.niaid.nih.gov/about/vrc

The Vaccine Research Center (VRC), is an intramural division of the National Institute of Allergy and Infectious Diseases (NIAID), part of the National Institutes of Health (NIH), US Department of Health and Human Services (HHS). The mission of the VRC is to discover and develop both vaccines and antibody-based products that target infectious diseases.

The broad research portfolio of the VRC includes basic, clinical, and translational research into vaccines for HIV, Ebola, Marburg, and RSV, among other viruses, and therapeutic antibodies against SARS-CoV-2 (the virus responsible for COVID-19) and other pathogens.

== History ==
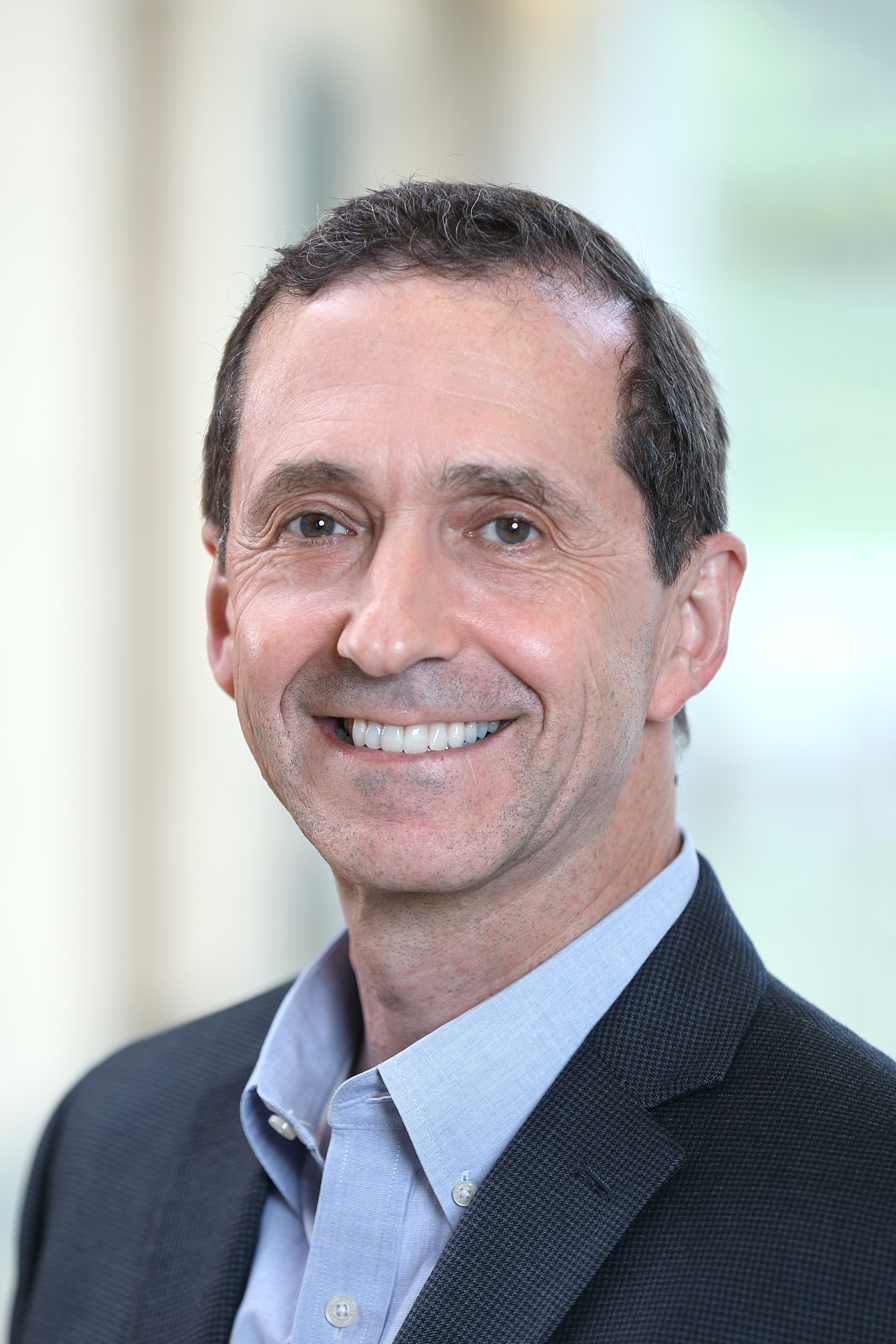
John R. Mascola, Director of the Vaccine Research Center

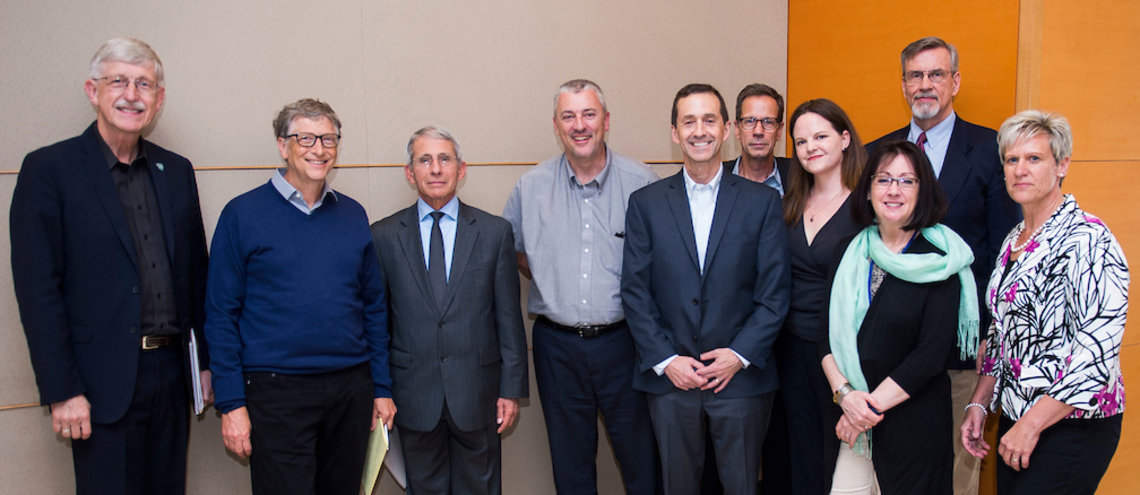
Bill Gates, Francis Collins, Anthony Fauci, John R. Mascola, and NIH Vaccine Research Center scientists

The origins of the Vaccine Research Center date back to 1996 following discussions between President Bill Clinton and NIAID Director Dr. Anthony Fauci regarding research addressing HIV/AIDS. Recognizing the potential impact a vaccine could make in decreasing the global public health burden of HIV, President Clinton in 1997 announced a plan to establish an HIV vaccine research center on the NIH campus. The dedication ceremony for the VRC took place in 1999 with President Clinton delivering the opening remarks.

Named in honor of immunization advocates former Governor of Arkansas Dale Bumpers and his wife Betty Flanagan Bumpers, the Vaccine Research Center opened its doors as Building 40 on the NIH campus in 2000. The founding investigators leading the new center came from a range of scientific disciplines including virology, immunology, structural biology, bioengineering, manufacturing, clinical research and regulatory science. While HIV vaccine research and development remains a core focus, the scope of activities has expanded to include advancing scientific understanding and developing biologics for a broad array of infectious pathogens.

=== Leadership ===
==== Director ====
No.	Portrait	Director	Took office	Left office	Refs
1		Gary J. Nabel	April 11, 1999	November 2012	
acting		John R. Mascola	November 2012	October 17, 2013	
2		John R. Mascola	October 17, 2013	March 31, 2022	
acting		Richard A. Koup	April 1, 2023	April 2023	
3		Ted C. Pierson	April 2023	Present	

==== Deputy Director ====
No.	Portrait	Deputy Director	Took office	Left office	Refs
1		John R. Mascola	September 2000	2013	
2		Richard Koup	January 2014	Present	
3		Barney S. Graham	January 2014	October 2021	
4		Julie E. Ledgerwood	November 2019	April 2022	
acting		Karin Bok	September 2022	September 2023	

== Organization ==
The VRC is composed of an Office of the Director, basic research laboratories and major programs.

Office of the Director:

- Management and Operations
- Scientific Partnerships and Collaborations
- Strategic Planning

Laboratories:

- Immunology Laboratory
  - Cellular Immunology Section
  - Flow Cytometry Core
  - The Genome Analysis Core
  - Human Immunology Section
  - Immunology Section
  - ImmunoTechnology Section
  - Integrative Bioinformatics of Immune Systems Core
  - Nonhuman Primate Immunogenicity Core
  - Pandemic Response Repository through Microbial and Immune Surveillance and Epidemiology (PREMISE)
  - Tissue Analysis Core
  - Virus Persistence and Dynamics Section
- Virology Laboratory
  - Humoral Immunology Core
  - Humoral Immunology Section
  - Structural Bioinformatics Core
  - Structural Biology Section
  - Virology Core
- Viral Pathogenesis Laboratory
  - Biodefense Research Section
  - Molecular ImmunoEngineering Section
  - Translational Science Core
  - Yeast Engineering Technology and Immunobiology Core

Programs:

- Clinical Trials Program
- Regulatory Science and Strategy Program
- Translational Research Program
- Vaccine Immunology Program
- Vaccine Production Program

== Research Areas ==
To advance scientific understanding of infectious pathogens and develop investigational biologics, the VRC maintains programs in the following:

Key scientific areas:

- Disease acquisition and viral pathogenesis
- Infection and vaccine-induced immune responses
- Structure-based vaccine design
- Structural basis for antibody-mediated virus neutralization
- Vaccine antigens, antibody platforms, and routes of delivery

Primary disease-specific programs:

- Alphaviruses (Chikungunya, Western/Eastern/Venezuelan Equine Encephalitis)
- Coronaviruses (SARS, MERS, SARS-CoV-2)
- Enterovirus D68
- Filoviruses (Ebola and Marburg)
- HIV/AIDS
- Influenza
- Malaria
- Nipah Virus
- Paramyxoviruses (Parainfluenza Virus and Human Metapneumovirus)
- Respiratory Syncytial Virus
- Tuberculosis
- Zika Virus

== Projects ==
=== HIV ===
In July 2010, a collaboration between the National Institute of Allergy and Infectious Diseases and officials at the Vaccine Research Center found that two human HIV antibodies, named VRC01 and VRC03, could potentially be used against a wide range of types and mutations of HIV in the design of a preventive HIV vaccine for human use, as well as in the formation of better antiretroviral therapy drug cocktails. The discovery, a potentially landmark one in the drive to find a vaccine for AIDS should it be validated and further improved.

=== Ebola ===
In 2016 research efforts led by Nancy Sullivan at Vaccine Research Center and J. J. Muyembe-Tamfum from the Institut National de Recherche Biomedicale (INRB) in the Democratic Republic of Congo resulted in the discovery of a monoclonal antibody, mAb114, from a survivor from the 1995 Kikwit outbreak of Ebola virus disease. mAb114 is a monoclonal antibody therapy that is being evaluated as a treatment for Ebola virus disease and has shown great success by lowering the mortality rate from 70% to about 34% in the 2018-2020 Kivu Ebola Virus Outbreak. In August 2019, Congolese health authorities, the World Health Organization, and the U.S. National Institutes of Health promoted the use of mAb114, alongside a similar Regeneron-produced treatment, over other treatments yielding higher mortality rates, after ending clinical trials during the outbreak.

== Image Gallery ==
Notable visits to Vaccine Research Center
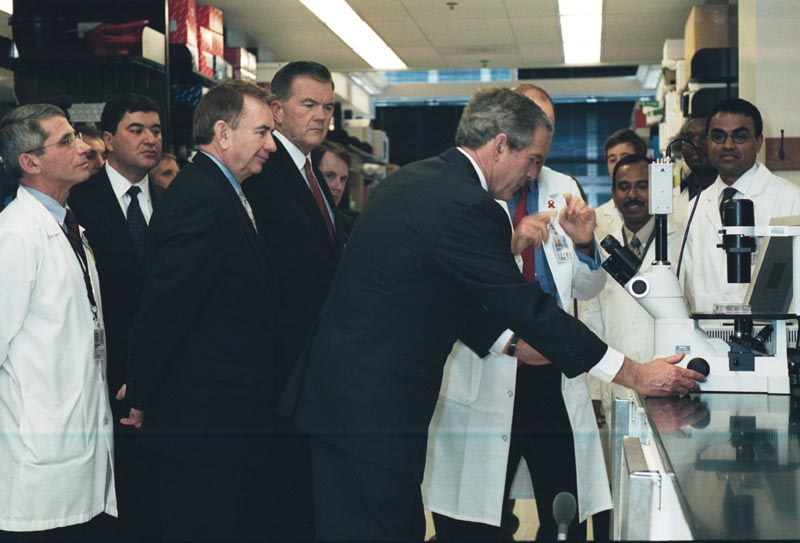
President George W. Bush visits the Vaccine Research Center

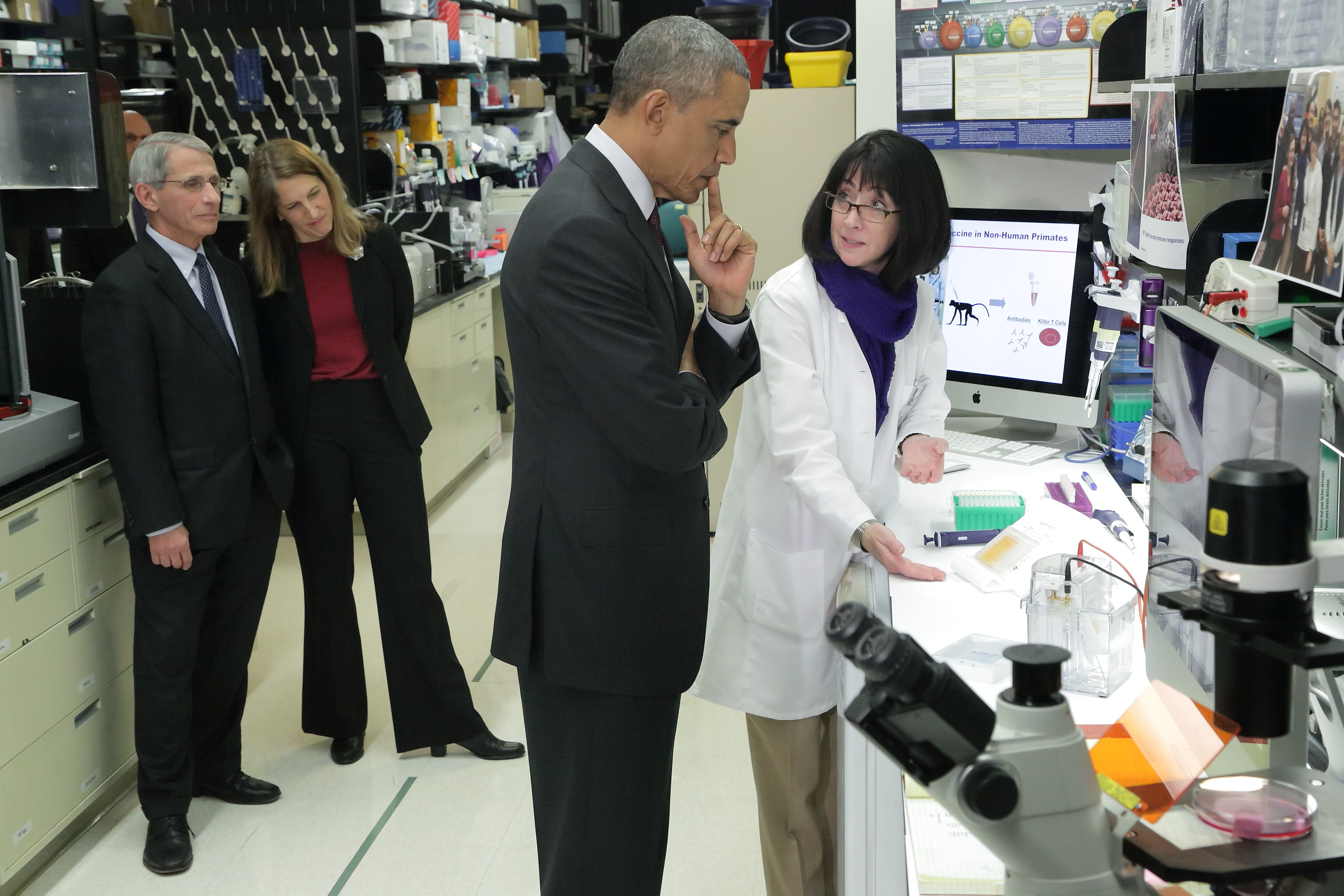
President Barack Obama visits the Vaccine Research Center

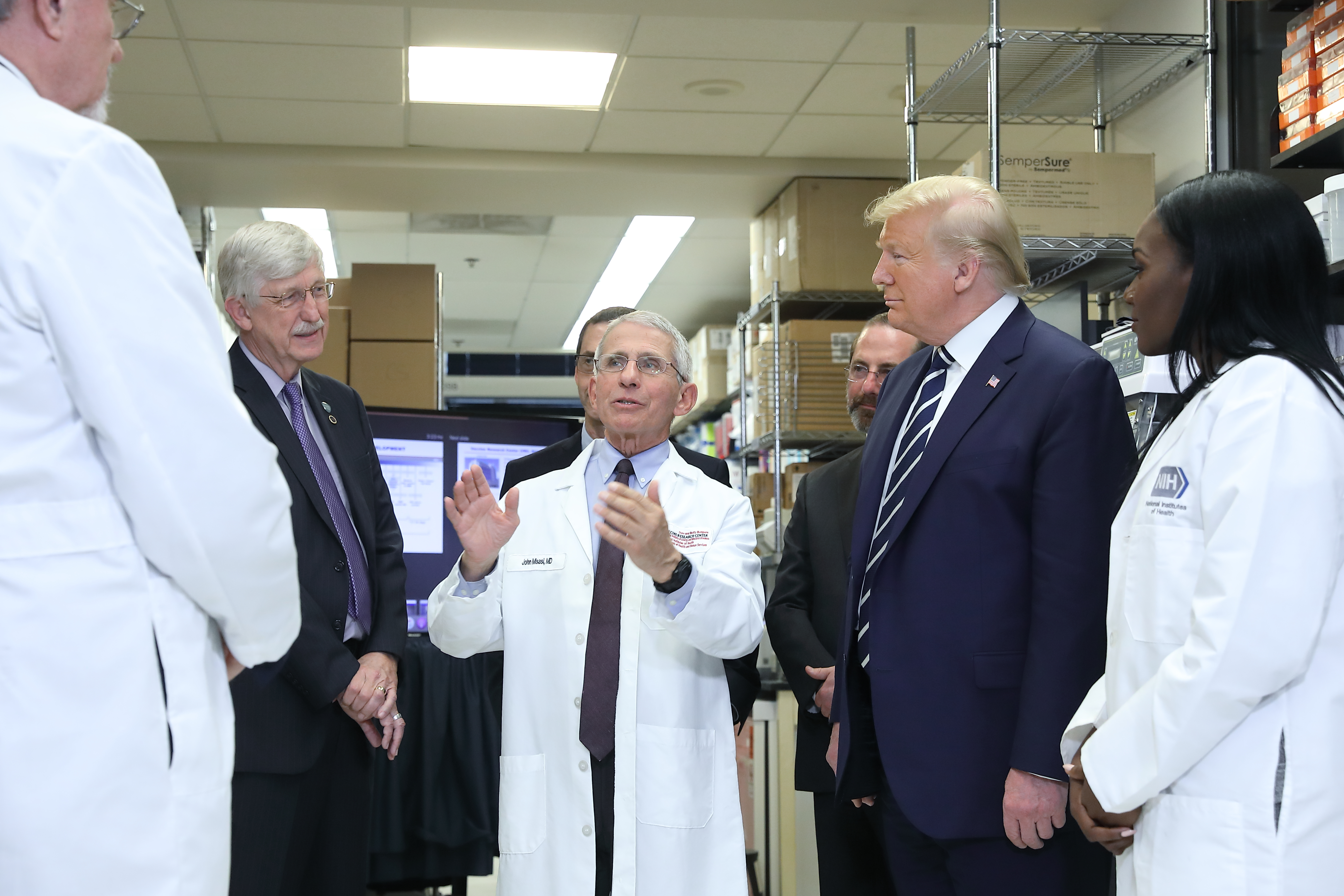
President Donald Trump visits the Vaccine Research Center

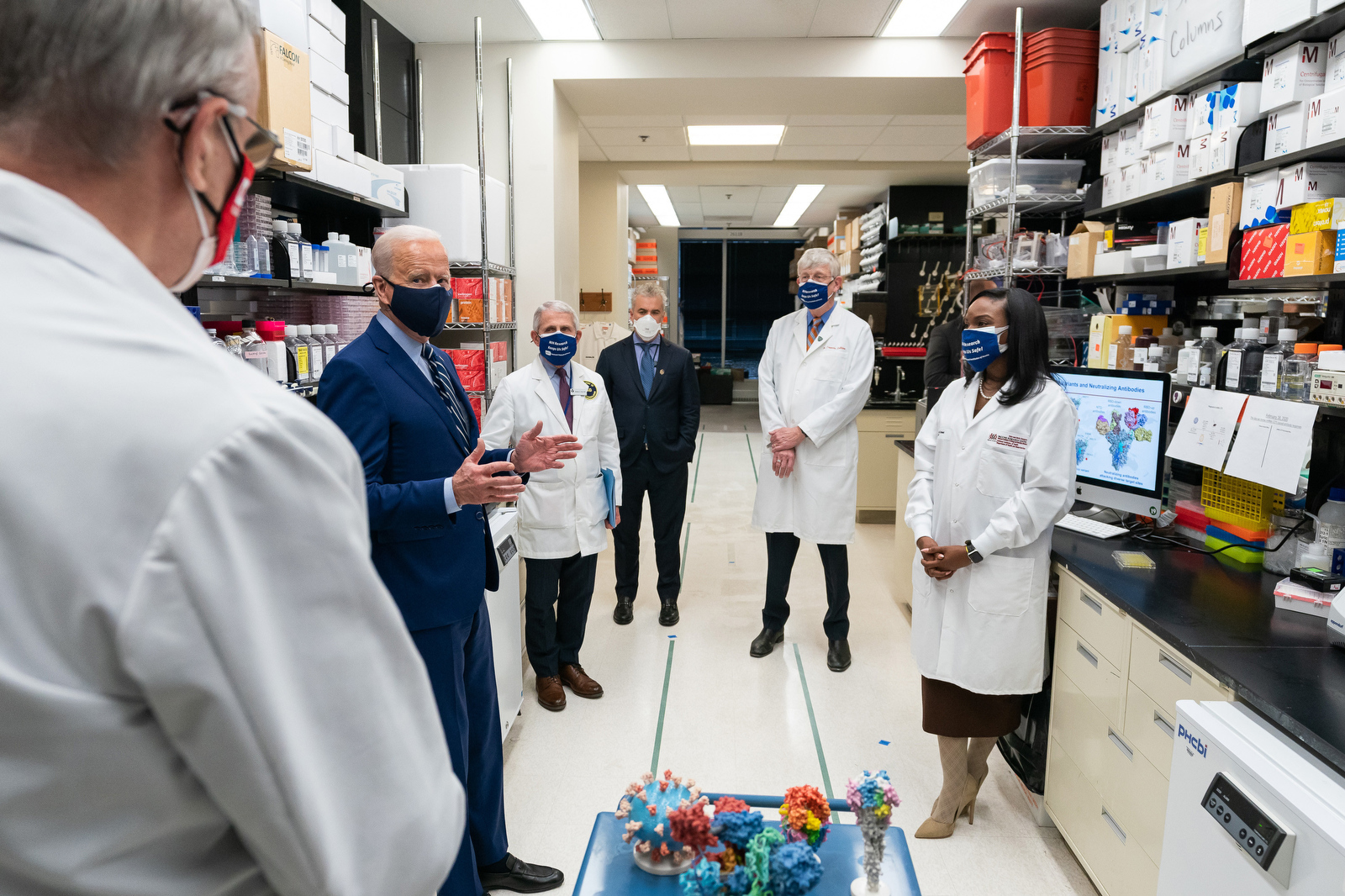
President Joseph Biden visits the Vaccine Research Center
