= Gary Nabel =

American virologist and immunologist

- Born: Gary J. Nabel
- Education: Harvard University; Brigham and Women’s Hospital
- Scientific career
- Fields: Virology; Immunology
- Workplaces: Sanofi; National Institute of Allergy and Infectious Diseases; Brigham and Women's Hospital; Harvard Medical School; University of Michigan

Gary J. Nabel is an American virologist and immunologist. He was the founding director of the Vaccine Research Center (VRC) at the National Institute of Allergy and Infectious Diseases (NIAID) from 1999 to 2012 and later served as chief scientific officer at Sanofi. He is the president and chief executive officer of ModeX Therapeutics, a biotechnology company based in Natick, Massachusetts. He has served as a director of SIGA Technologies since June 2021.

== Education ==
Nabel received a bachelor’s degree from Harvard University in 1975 and an MD–PhD from Harvard in 1982. He completed his residency in internal medicine at Brigham and Women’s Hospital in 1985, and then undertook postdoctoral research, which focused on the transcriptional regulation of HIV gene expression by the transcription factor NF-κB.

== Scientific career and research ==
From 1987 to 1999, Nabel led a research laboratory at the University of Michigan, with the support of Howard Hughes Medical Institute. During this time, he conducted research on gene therapy and transcriptional regulation of cellular and viral gene expression.

In 1999, Nabel was appointed as the founding director of the Vaccine Research Center (VRC) at the National Institute of Allergy and Infectious Diseases under the NIH. Research during Nabel's tenure at the VRC included studies on immune mechanisms of protection against Ebola and the identification of broadly neutralizing antibodies to the CD4 binding site on HIV.

In 2012, Nabel became the Chief Scientific Officer at Sanofi. He continued his research on neutralizing antibodies against HIV and led studies on antibody-mediated stimulation of CD8 T cells using multi-specific antibodies. In 2020, Nabel co-founded ModeX Therapeutics, a biopharmaceutical company primarily focused on these multi-specific antibodies. ModeX was acquired by OPKO Health in 2022.

Nabel has held positions across various scientific advisory boards and councils, including as Chairman of the Strategic Development and Scientific Advisory Council (SDSAC).

== Awards and appointments ==
- The Amgen Scientific Achievement Award from the American Society for Biochemistry and Molecular Biology
- The Health and Human Services Secretary’s Award for Distinguished Service
- The Geoffrey Beene Foundation Builders of Science Award from Research America
- The James Tolbert Shipley Prize for Research at Harvard Medical School
- An honorary degree from the University of London
- The U.S. Army Medical Department’s Order of Military Medical Merit
- An elected fellow of the Association of American Physicians, the American Academy of Arts and Sciences, and the AAAS
- Elected to the American Society for Clinical Investigation in 1992 and the National Academy of Medicine in 1998
- Served as the Chair of the Board of Directors for the Keystone Symposia from 2017 to 2019
- Council Delegate to the AAAS, Medical Sciences Section, from 1997 to 2002
- Editor for the Journal of Virology from 1995 to 2005
