= Ridgeback Biotherapeutics =

American biotechnology company

Ridgeback Biotherapeutics is a Miami-based biotechnology company, primarily known for its involvement in developing a successful COVID-19 medication.

Ridgeback is privately owned by hedge fund manager and physician, Wayne Holman (formerly of S.A.C. Capital Advisors) and his wife Wendy Holman. Wendy is the CEO at the company, which refers to itself as a majority woman owned business.

In early 2020, Ridgeback purchased an exclusive license for the commercial development of Molnupiravir from Emory University, where the drug was initially developed with $16 million in grants from Federal agencies including the National Institutes of Health. The terms of the deal were undisclosed. Molnupiravir was initially researched as a treatment for influenza, but may have broad spectrum activity against other viruses.

Ridgeback was mentioned in a whistleblower complaint from Rick Bright, former director of the Biomedical Advanced Research and Development Authority. The complaint alleged that Ridgeback lobbied the government for millions in funding to help develop Molnupiravir.

Merck & Co. partnered with Ridgeback to perform clinical trials with Molnupiravir in humans to treat COVID-19. Ridgeback has also developed a number of other advanced medications such as monoclonal antibody Ansuvimab against the Ebola virus.
