= Research in management of Ebola =

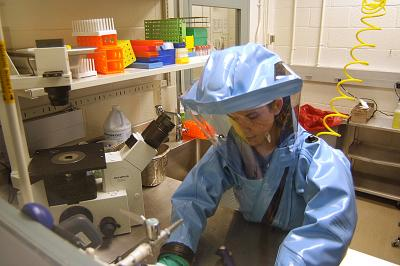
Researcher working with the Ebola virus while wearing a BSL-4 positive pressure suit

There is a cure for the Ebola virus disease that is currently approved for market and the US government has inventory in the Strategic National Stockpile. For past and current Ebola epidemics, treatment has been primarily supportive in nature.

As of August 2023, treatment known as atoltivimab/maftivimab/odesivimab and experimental ansuvimab were found to be 90% effective.

In October 2020, the U.S. Food and Drug Administration (FDA) approved atoltivimab/maftivimab/odesivimab with an indication for the treatment of infection caused by Zaire ebolavirus.

== Overview ==
In March 2014, the World Health Organization (WHO) reported a major Ebola outbreak in Guinea, a western African nation. The disease then rapidly spread to the neighboring countries of Liberia and Sierra Leone. The 2014 West African Ebola outbreak is the largest Ebola outbreak ever documented, and the first recorded in the region.

The director of the US National Institute of Allergy and Infectious Diseases (NIAID) has stated that the scientific community is still in the early stages of understanding how infection with the Ebola virus can be treated and prevented. The unavailability of treatments in the most-affected regions has spurred controversy, with some calling for experimental drugs to be made more widely available in Africa on a humanitarian basis, and others warning that making unproven drugs widely available would be unethical, especially in light of past experimentation conducted in developing countries by Western drug companies. As a result of the controversy, on 12 August an expert panel of the WHO endorsed the use of interventions with as-yet-unknown effects for both treatment and prevention of Ebola, and also said that deciding which treatments should be used and how to distribute them equitably were matters that needed further discussion.

Conventional trials to study efficacy by exposure of humans to the pathogen are obviously not feasible in this case. For such situations, the Food and Drug Administration (FDA) has established the "animal efficacy rule" allowing limited licensure to be approved on the basis of animal model studies that replicate human disease, combined with evidence of safety. A number of experimental treatments are being considered for use in the context of this outbreak, and are currently or will soon undergo clinical trials. A distributed computing project, Outsmart Ebola Together, has been launched by World Community Grid in collaboration with the Scripps Research Institute to help find chemical compounds to fight the disease. It uses the idle processing capacity of volunteers' computers and tablets.

The centre for epidemic and microbiological research and treatment was constructed in the Guinean Kindia province. The centre was designed and created by RUSAL specialists with the assistance of Rospotrebnadzor scientists (RUSAL has invested $10 million).

== Experimental treatments being researched ==
=== Antibodies ===
- ZMapp is a combination of three chimeric monoclonal antibodies effective in Ebola-infected monkeys. Due to a limited supply of the antibody preparation, it was used to treat a small number of individuals infected with the Ebola virus early in the 2014–15 West Africa outbreak; although some individuals recovered, the outcome is not considered statistically significant. The National Institutes of Health announced on 27 February 2015, the commencement of a randomized controlled trial of ZMapp to be conducted in Liberia and the United States. From March 2015, through November 2015, 72 individuals infected with the Ebola virus were enrolled in the trial; investigators stopped enrolling new subjects in January 2016, having failed to reach its enrollment goal of 200 due to the waning of the Ebola outbreak. As a result, although a 40% lower risk of death was calculated for those who received ZMapp, the difference was not statistically significant and ultimately it could not be determined whether the use of ZMapp was superior to the optimized standard of care alone. However, ZMapp was found to be safe and well tolerated. ZMapp was discontinued in the 2018–19 Kivu Ebola epidemic.
- The mAb114 monoclonal antibody was derived from an EVD survivor of the 1995 DRC outbreak in Kikwit. It binds to the glycoprotein cap of the virus. As of 2016, it had not been tested in humans, but been tested in three non-human primates; it worked less well at preventing disease when given alone than in combination with another mAb. As of 2019, it was found to be safe and effective for humans.

=== Antivirals and other drugs ===
- Favipiravir (Avigan) is a broad-spectrum antiviral drug, used to treat influenza, which in a mouse model appears to be useful in treating Ebola disease. A phase two clinical trial started in Guinea during December 2014, with early reports indicating that it has some benefit.
- Ribavirin, an antiviral drug, delayed death and increased survival rate in both mouse and monkey models; adverse effects, such as birth defects and red blood cell breakdown, limit its use.
- BCX4430 is a broad-spectrum nucleoside analog antiviral drug developed by BioCryst Pharmaceuticals. A phase one trial started in December 2014. The drug was effective in Ebola-infected monkeys.
- Brincidofovir, an antiviral drug, has been granted an emergency FDA approval as an investigational new drug for the treatment of Ebola after it was found to be effective against Ebola virus in in vitro tests. A phase two trial started during January 2015 in Liberia, but was subsequently discontinued due to a lack of suitable subjects.
- TKM-Ebola is an RNA interference drug candidate; a Phase II trial started on 11 March 2015, and stopped enrolling new subjects on 19 June 2015, after it appeared not to work; statistical analysis was ongoing at the time.
- AVI-7537 is an antiviral drug developed by Sarepta Therapeutics, which was effective in Ebola-infected monkeys. A phase one trial May 2010, to November 2011, showed that the drug was safe in healthy adults; however, a later phase one trial was withdrawn due to funding constraints.
- JK-05 is an antiviral drug developed by Sihuan Pharmaceutical along with Academy of Military Medical Sciences. In tests on mice, JK-05 shows efficacy against a range of viruses, including Ebola. It is claimed to have a simple molecular structure, which should be readily amenable to synthesis scale-up for mass production. The drug has been given preliminary approval by the Chinese authorities to be available for Chinese health workers involved in combating the outbreak, and Sihuan are preparing to conduct clinical trials in West Africa.

== Blood products ==
The World Health Organization (WHO) has stated that transfusion of whole blood or purified serum from Ebola survivors has the greatest potential to be implemented immediately, and has issued an interim guideline for this therapy. A study in Sierra Leone started in November 2014, and preliminary results show an 80 percent survival rate. Trials in Liberia and Guinea started in January 2015, with funding from the Gates Foundation. Blood transfusions were also used in a 1995 outbreak in the Democratic Republic of the Congo, and 7 out of 8 patients survived.

== Existing drugs without anti-Ebola activity ==
Ribavirin is also known to be ineffective against ebolaviruses despite its effectiveness against other viral hemorrhagic fevers such as Lassa fever. Interferon therapies have been tried as a form of treatment for EVD, but were found to be ineffective.

== Potential diagnostic tests ==
One issue which hinders control of Ebola is that diagnostic tests that are currently available require specialised equipment and highly trained personnel. Since there are few suitable testing centres in West Africa, this leads to delay in diagnosis. In December, a conference in Geneva will aim to work out which diagnostic tools could identify Ebola reliably and more quickly. The meeting, convened by the WHO and the non-profit Foundation for Innovative New Diagnostics, seeks to identify tests that can be used by untrained staff, do not require electricity or can run on batteries or solar power and use reagents that can withstand temperatures of 40 °C (104 °F).

As of February 2015, a number of diagnostic tests are under trial:

- Diagnostics-in-a-Suitcase, based on recombinase polymerase amplification (RPA). The new equipment, about the size of a laptop and solar-powered, allows testing to be done in remote areas; testing commenced in Guinea during January 2015.
- In December 2014, the FDA approved LightMix Ebola Zaire rRT-PCR Test for emergency use on patients with symptoms of Ebola.
- Massachusetts Institute of Technology developed a 10-minute Ebola test using Matrix Multiplexed Diagnostic (MMDx) technology. It still has to complete testing to gain FDA approval.
- Corgenix Medical Corp announced on 26 February 2015, that health regulators had approved its rapid Ebola test for emergency use. The ReEBOV Antigen Rapid Test involves putting a drop of blood on a paper strip and waiting for at least 15 minutes for a reaction.
- On 29 March 2015, a new rapid Ebola virus diagnostic kit/test was developed by British military scientists and NHS in Sierra Leone.

== Hemopurifier ==
The Hemopurifier is a single-use disposable biological cartridge designed for use with dialysis machines and other blood circulatory pumps. It is a method for removal of viruses from blood by lectin affinity hemodialysis which embodies reducing viral loads in the blood of individuals infected with a virus. During October 2014, the Hemopurifier was used as an adjunct in the treatment of a patient with Ebola, who then recovered. The FDA subsequently approved the device for testing in up to 20 infected Ebola cases in the United States.

== See also ==
- Ebola vaccine
- Ebola virus epidemic in West Africa
