= FGI =

FGI may refer to:

- Fagali'i Airport, in Samoa
- Faith and Globalisation Initiative, an international group of universities
- Fashion Group International, a professional organization in the fashion industry
- FASA Games, Inc.
- Functional group interconversion
- Functional Genetics, Inc, e.g. FGI-103, FGI-104, FGI-106.
