= LJ-001 =

Chemical compound

- Molecular structure of LJ-001

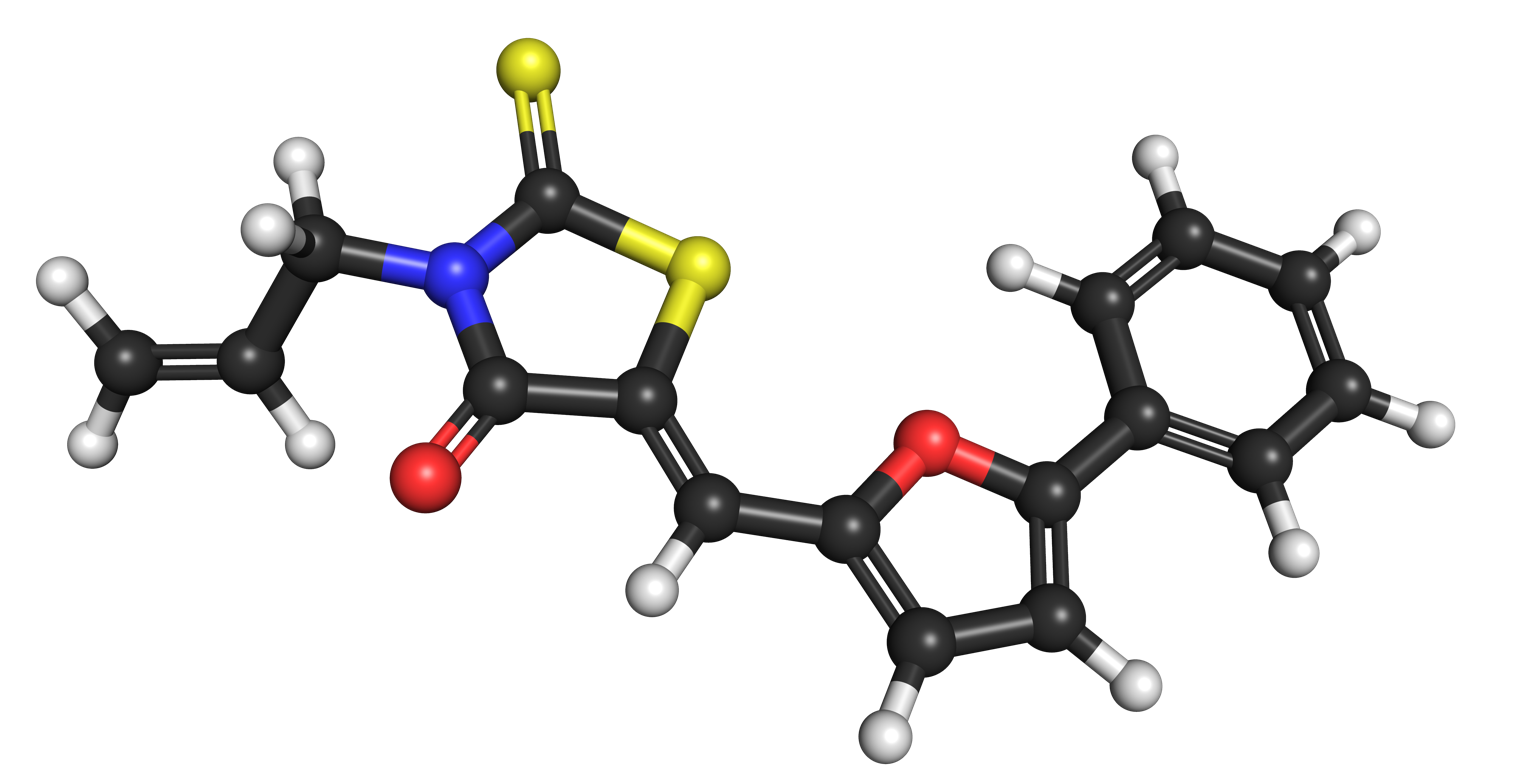
- 3D representation of an LJ-001 molecule

Identifiers
- IUPAC name: (5Z)-5-[(5-phenylfuran-2-yl)methylidene]-3-prop-2-enyl-2-sulfanylidene-1,3-thiazolidin-4-one
- CAS Number: 851305-26-5
- PubChem CID: 2272467
- ChemSpider: 23288467
- UNII: 8646IPJ1AP
- CompTox Dashboard (EPA): DTXSID101028056

Chemical and physical data
- Formula: C_{17}H_{13}NO_{2}S_{2}
- Molar mass: 327.42 g·mol^{−1}
- 3D model (JSmol): Interactive image
- SMILES: c3ccccc3-c(cc2)oc2\C=C(\C1=O)/SC(=S)N1CC=C
- InChI: InChI=1S/C17H13NO2S2/c1-2-10-18-16(19)15(22-17(18)21)11-13-8-9-14(20-13)12-6-4-3-5-7-12/h2-9,11H,1,10H2/b15-11-; Key:YAIFLEPRFXXIFQ-PTNGSMBKSA-N

LJ-001 is a broad-spectrum antiviral drug developed as a potential treatment for enveloped viruses. It acts as an inhibitor which blocks viral entry into host cells at a step after virus binding but before virus–cell fusion, and also irreversibly inactivates the virions themselves by generating reactive singlet oxygen molecules which damage the viral membrane. In cell culture tests in vitro, LJ-001 was able to block and disable a wide range of different viruses, including influenza A, filoviruses, poxviruses, arenaviruses, bunyaviruses, paramyxoviruses, flaviviruses, and HIV. Unfortunately LJ-001 itself was unsuitable for further development, as it has poor physiological stability and requires light for its antiviral mechanism to operate. However the discovery of this novel mechanism for blocking virus entry and disabling the virion particles has led to LJ-001 being used as a lead compound to develop a novel family of more effective antiviral drugs with improved properties.

== See also ==
- Brincidofovir
- BCX4430
- Favipiravir
- FGI-103
- FGI-104
- FGI-106
