= FGI-106 =

Chemical compound

Legal status
- Legal status: US: Investigational New Drug

Identifiers
- IUPAC name: N^{1},N^{7}-bis[3-(dimethylamino)propyl]-3,9-dimethylquinolino[8,7-h]quinoline-1,7-diamine
- CAS Number: 501081-38-5
- PubChem CID: 432342
- ChemSpider: 382357
- UNII: BRT994456W
- CompTox Dashboard (EPA): DTXSID701028028

Chemical and physical data
- Formula: C_{28}H_{38}N_{6}
- Molar mass: 458.654 g·mol^{−1}
- 3D model (JSmol): Interactive image
- SMILES: CN(C)CCCNc(c2ccc14)cc(C)nc2c1ccc3c4nc(C)cc3NCCCN(C)C
- InChI: InChI=1S/C28H38N6/c1-19-17-25(29-13-7-15-33(3)4)23-11-10-22-21(27(23)31-19)9-12-24-26(18-20(2)32-28(22)24)30-14-8-16-34(5)6/h9-12,17-18H,7-8,13-16H2,1-6H3,(H,29,31)(H,30,32); Key:WJUPENLNVUCETH-UHFFFAOYSA-N

FGI-106 is a broad-spectrum antiviral drug developed as a potential treatment for enveloped RNA viruses, in particular viral hemorrhagic fevers from the bunyavirus, flavivirus and filovirus families. It acts as an inhibitor which blocks viral entry into host cells. In animal tests FGI-106 shows both prophylactic and curative action against a range of deadly viruses for which few existing treatments are available, including the bunyaviruses hantavirus, Rift Valley fever virus and Crimean-Congo hemorrhagic fever virus, the flavivirus dengue virus, and the filoviruses Ebola virus and Marburg virus.

== See also ==
- Brincidofovir
- BCX4430
- Favipiravir
- FGI-103
- FGI-104
- LJ-001
- TKM-Ebola
- ZMapp
