= Galidesivir =

Antiviral drug

Legal status
- Legal status: US: Investigational New Drug

Identifiers
- IUPAC name: (2S,3S,4R,5R)-2-(4-Amino-5H-pyrrolo[3,2-d]pyrimidin-7-yl)-5-(hydroxymethyl)pyrrolidine-3,4-diol
- CAS Number: 249503-25-1; HCl: 222631-44-9
- PubChem CID: 69211190
- ChemSpider: 8620968
- UNII: OLF97F86A7; HCl: 1EL1K52SH1

Chemical and physical data
- Formula: C_{11}H_{15}N_{5}O_{3}
- Molar mass: 265.273 g·mol^{−1}
- 3D model (JSmol): Interactive image
- SMILES: O[C@H]3[C@H](c2c1ncnc(N)c1[nH]c2)N[C@H](CO)[C@H]3O
- InChI: InChI=1S/C11H15N5O3/c12-11-8-6(14-3-15-11)4(1-13-8)7-10(19)9(18)5(2-17)16-7/h1,3,5,7,9-10,13,16-19H,2H2,(H2,12,14,15)/t5-,7+,9-,10+/m1/s1; Key:AMFDITJFBUXZQN-KUBHLMPHSA-N

Galidesivir (BCX4430, immucillin-A) is an antiviral drug, an adenosine analog (a type of nucleoside analog). It was developed by BioCryst Pharmaceuticals with funding from NIAID, originally intended as a treatment for hepatitis C, but subsequently developed as a potential treatment for deadly filovirus infections such as Ebola virus disease and Marburg virus disease, as well as Zika virus. Currently, galidesivir is under phase 1 human trial in Brazil for coronavirus.

It also shows broad-spectrum antiviral effectiveness against a range of other RNA virus families, including bunyaviruses, arenaviruses, paramyxoviruses, coronaviruses, flaviviruses, and phleboviruses. Galidesivir has been demonstrated to protect against both Ebola and Marburg viruses in both rodents and monkeys, even when administered up to 48 hours after infection, and development for use in humans was then being fast-tracked due to concerns about the lack of treatment options for the 2013-2016 Ebola virus epidemic in West Africa.

Galidesivir later showed efficacy against Zika virus in a mouse model.

Galidesivir abrogates viremia in Zika virus–infected rhesus Macaques.

Galidesivir is one of several antiviral drugs being tested for coronavirus disease 2019.

On April 9, 2020, BioCryst opened enrollment into a randomized, double-blind, placebo-controlled clinical trial to assess the safety, clinical impact and antiviral effects of galidesivir in patients with COVID-19.

== See also ==
- Atoltivimab/maftivimab/odesivimab
- Bemnifosbuvir
- Brincidofovir
- Coronavir
- 3-Deazaneplanocin A
- Favipiravir
- FGI-106
- GS-441524
- JK-05
- Lopinavir/ritonavir
- Lamivudine
- Ansuvimab
- MK-608
- Molnupiravir
- Nelfinavir
- Oseltamivir
- Nirmatrelvir/ritonavir
- Peramivir
- Remdesivir
- Ribavirin
- Ensitrelvir
- TKM-Ebola
- Triazavirin
- Umifenovir
- ZMapp
