= NITD008 =

Chemical compound

Clinical data
- Trade names: NITD008

Identifiers
- IUPAC name: (2R,3R,4R,5R)-2-(4-Amino-7H-pyrrolo[2,3-d]pyrimidin-7-yl)-3-ethynyl-5-(hydroxymethyl)tetrahydrofuran-3,4-diol
- CAS Number: 1044589-82-3
- PubChem CID: 44633776
- ChemSpider: 26376187
- UNII: LKI7T3WQ2E
- ChEMBL: ChEMBL1630221
- CompTox Dashboard (EPA): DTXSID701159354

Chemical and physical data
- Formula: C_{13}H_{14}N_{4}O_{4}
- Molar mass: 290.279 g·mol^{−1}
- 3D model (JSmol): Interactive image
- SMILES: C#C[C@]1([C@@H]([C@H](O[C@H]1N2C=CC3=C2N=CN=C3N)CO)O)O
- InChI: InChI=1S/C13H14N4O4/c1-2-13(20)9(19)8(5-18)21-12(13)17-4-3-7-10(14)15-6-16-11(7)17/h1,3-4,6,8-9,12,18-20H,5H2,(H2,14,15,16)/t8-,9-,12-,13-/m1/s1; Key:NKRAIOQPSBRMOV-NRMKKVEVSA-N

NITD008 is an antiviral drug classified as an adenosine analog (a type of nucleoside analog). It was developed as a potential treatment for flavivirus infections and shows broad spectrum antiviral activity against many related viruses such as dengue virus, West Nile virus, yellow fever virus, Powassan virus, hepatitis C virus, Kyasanur Forest disease virus, Omsk hemorrhagic fever virus, and Zika virus. However, NITD008 proved too toxic in pre-clinical animal testing to be suitable for human trials, but it continues to be used in research to find improved treatments for emerging viral diseases.

== See also ==
- Favipiravir, a drug approved by China, Germany, Indonesia, Iran, Japan, Thailand, and Turkey for treating COVID-19 patients
- MK-608, a drug with a similar structure
- Remdesivir, FDA approved antiviral drug with a similar structure
- Ribavirin, another antiviral drug with teratogenic side effects that was patented by Merck in 1971 and approved by the FDA in 1986
