= MK-608 =

Chemical compound

Clinical data
- Other names: 7-Deaza-2'-C-methyladenosine; 7DMA

Legal status
- Legal status: US: Investigational New Drug

Identifiers
- IUPAC name: (2R,3R,4R,5R)-2-(4-Aminopyrrolo[2,3-d]pyrimidin-7-yl)-5-(hydroxymethyl)-3-methyloxolane-3,4-diol
- CAS Number: 443642-29-3
- PubChem CID: 3011893
- ChemSpider: 2280834
- UNII: QRR62J6WEF
- CompTox Dashboard (EPA): DTXSID60963208

Chemical and physical data
- Formula: C_{12}H_{16}N_{4}O_{4}
- Molar mass: 280.284 g·mol^{−1}
- 3D model (JSmol): Interactive image
- SMILES: C[C@]1([C@@H]([C@H](O[C@H]1n2ccc3c2ncnc3N)CO)O)O
- InChI: InChI=1S/C12H16N4O4/c1-12(19)8(18)7(4-17)20-11(12)16-3-2-6-9(13)14-5-15-10(6)16/h2-3,5,7-8,11,17-19H,4H2,1H3,(H2,13,14,15)/t7-,8-,11-,12-/m1/s1; Key:IRZRJANZDIOOIF-GAJNKVMBSA-N

MK-608 (7-deaza-2'-C-methyladenosine, 7DMA) is an antiviral drug, an adenosine analog (a type of nucleoside analog). It was originally developed by Merck & Co. as a treatment for hepatitis C, but despite promising results in animal studies, it was ultimately unsuccessful in clinical trials. Subsequently it has been widely used in antiviral research and has shown activity against a range of viruses, including Dengue fever, tick-borne encephalitis virus, poliovirus, and most recently Zika virus, in both in vitro and animal models. Since it has already failed in human clinical trials previously, it is unlikely MK-608 itself will be developed as an antiviral medication, but the continuing lack of treatment options for these emerging viral diseases means that much research continues using MK-608 and related antiviral drugs.

== Chemistry ==
7DMA differs from tubercidin (7-deaza-adenosine) by the addition of a methyl group on the 2' position of the ribose ring. It was originally discovered in 2004 in an in vitro model.

== See also ==
- DZNep
- Favipiravir
- Galidesivir
- NITD008
- Remdesivir
- Ribavirin
