= C16H14N4O =

The molecular formula C_{16}H_{14}N_{4}O (molar mass: 278.31 g/mol, exact mass: 278.1168 u) may refer to:

- Adibendan
- Sudan Yellow 3G, also known as Solvent Yellow 16 or C.I. disperse yellow
- GHP-88310, also known as EIDD-3608
