= Janagliflozin =

Chemical compound

Legal status
- Legal status: Rx in China; investigational elsewhere

Identifiers
- IUPAC name: (2S,3R,4R,5S,6R)-2-[3-[[4-[[(1R,5S)-3-bicyclo[3.1.0]hexanyl]oxy]phenyl]methyl]-4-chlorophenyl]-6-(hydroxymethyl)oxane-3,4,5-triol
- CAS Number: 1800115-22-3
- PubChem CID: 91820686
- DrugBank: DB16209
- UNII: WK4RT85HCA

Chemical and physical data
- Formula: C_{25}H_{29}ClO_{6}
- Molar mass: 460.95 g·mol^{−1}
- 3D model (JSmol): Interactive image
- SMILES: C1[C@H]2[C@@H]1CC(C2)OC3=CC=C(C=C3)CC4=C(C=CC(=C4)[C@H]5[C@@H]([C@H]([C@@H]([C@H](O5)CO)O)O)O)Cl
- InChI: InChI=1S/C25H29ClO6/c26-20-6-3-14(25-24(30)23(29)22(28)21(12-27)32-25)8-17(20)7-13-1-4-18(5-2-13)31-19-10-15-9-16(15)11-19/h1-6,8,15-16,19,21-25,27-30H,7,9-12H2/t15-,16+,19?,21-,22-,23+,24-,25+/m1/s1; Key:WDBIPGHUEJEKTC-VWQPKTIXSA-N

Janagliflozin is an SGLT2 inhibitor developed by Sihuan Pharmaceutical. It is approved in China for the treatment of type 2 diabetes.
