= Ebola drug =

Potential Ebola drugs include:

- Ebola virus disease treatment research (non-vaccine treatments under development)
- Ebola vaccines under development
