= ERDRP-0519 =

Chemical compound

Legal status
- Legal status: US: Investigational New Drug

Identifiers
- IUPAC name: 2-methyl-N-[4-[(2S)-2-(2-morpholin-4-ylethyl)piperidin-1-yl]sulfonylphenyl]-5-(trifluoromethyl)pyrazole-3-carboxamide
- CAS Number: 1374006-96-8
- PubChem CID: 57521469
- ChemSpider: 28514843
- UNII: V5S4Z5Q9VU

Chemical and physical data
- Formula: C_{23}H_{30}F_{3}N_{5}O_{4}S
- Molar mass: 529.58 g·mol^{−1}
- 3D model (JSmol): Interactive image
- SMILES: Cn1c(cc(n1)C(F)(F)F)C(=O)Nc2ccc(cc2)S(=O)(=O)N3CCCC[C@H]3CCN4CCOCC4
- InChI: InChI=1S/C23H30F3N5O4S/c1-29-20(16-21(28-29)23(24,25)26)22(32)27-17-5-7-19(8-6-17)36(33,34)31-10-3-2-4-18(31)9-11-30-12-14-35-15-13-30/h5-8,16,18H,2-4,9-15H2,1H3,(H,27,32)/t18-/m0/s1; Key:JVZHTUQIMBYDSX-SFHVURJKSA-N

ERDRP-0519 is an antiviral drug which is the first drug specifically developed to target the measles morbillivirus. It acts as an inhibitor of the viral enzyme RNA polymerase which is essential for viral replication, and in animal studies showed good oral bioavailability and protected ferrets from otherwise lethal doses of a morbillivirus when administered up to three days after infection.

== History ==
The research was done at Georgia State University and the Paul Ehrlich Institute.

== See also ==
- Favipiravir
- GHP-88310
- JK-05
- Sofosbuvir
