= Sihuan Pharmaceutical =

Chinese pharmaceutical manufacturer

Sihuan Pharmaceutical is a Chinese pharmaceutical manufacturer with headquarters in Beijing and branch office in Haikou, Hainan Province. It is listed on the Hong Kong Stock Exchange, through the holding company Sihuan Pharmaceutical Holdings Group Ltd (SEHK: 460).

Sihuan Pharmaceutical is collaborating with the Academy of Military Medical Science in the development of the drug JK-05, intended for the treatment of Ebola virus disease. The company has been challenged by Fujifilm Holdings Corporation, which has stated that JK-05 infringes its patent rights regarding Avigan.
