= Arbutus Biopharma =

Canadian Bio Tech Company

Arbutus Biopharma Corporation
- Type: Public
- Traded as: Nasdaq: ABUS; Russell 2000 Component
- Industry: Biotechnology
- Founded: 2007; 19 years ago
- Headquarters: Vancouver, British Columbia, Canada
- Products: HBV Therapies, AB-729, AB-836
- Website: https://arbutusbio.com/

Arbutus Biopharma Corporation is a publicly traded Canadian (NASDAQ: ABUS) biopharmaceutical company with expertise in liposomal drug delivery and RNA interference, and is developing drugs for hepatitis B infection.

It is headquartered in Warminster, Pennsylvania. The company was formerly known as Tekmira, which was spun out of Inex Pharmaceuticals in 2007.

== History ==
Tekmira, as the company was formerly called, was formed as a wholly owned subsidiary of Inex Pharmaceuticals in 2005 after that company began collapsing after its regulatory and partnering strategy failed in 2004. Tekmira was fully spun out in 2007 and Tekmira absorbed the assets of Inex, which had been founded in 1992.

Inex had been developing liposomal formulations of off-patent cancer drugs, and licensed them to Talon Pharmaceuticals in 2005; Talon was acquired by Spectrum Pharmaceuticals in 2013, and three former Inex/Tekmira products reached the market and began generating royalties for Tekmira: Marqibo (liposomal vincristine), Alocrest (liposomal vinorelbine) and Brakiva (liposomal topotecan).

Inex had also acquired licenses to intellectual property, as well as staff and manufacturing facilities, concerning RNAi technology from Lynx Therapeutics in 1998; this set of technologies became the focus for Tekmira and it initially sought to develop liposomally encapsulated RNAi drugs for a broad range of indications.

Tekmira also worked on providing liposomal delivery technology to other companies. In 2007 it signed a license agreement with Alnylam Pharmaceuticals so that Alnylam could use it to deliver its own RNAi drugs; that deal was expanded into a manufacturing agreement in 2009.

Most of those products not focused on viral diseases faltered, and Tekmira had only $6.3 million in cash when it filed suit against Alnylam in 2011 for breaching its contract and stealing trade secrets. The suit was settled in 2012, with Alnylam agreeing to pay Tekmira $65 million in termination fees, and the companies negotiated a new license agreement with lower milestones and royalties, which covers Alnylam's product patisiran.

Tekmira caught the world's attention and its stock rose dramatically during the 2013 West African Ebola virus epidemic due to its drug candidate for Ebola fever, TKM-Ebola. Tekmira was developing it under a $140 million US Department of Defense contract. While its stock was trading high in January 2015, it acquired OnCore BioPharma, a company focused on hepatitis B.

On December 19, 2014, Tekmira announced the appointment of former Bill & Melinda Gates Foundation CFO Richard Henriques to the company's board of directors. The company simultaneously announced the forthcoming departure of Ian MacLachlan as Executive Vice President and Chief Technical Officer.

Development of TKM-Ebola was terminated in mid June 2015 during a Phase II trial, for lack of efficacy.

The next month, Tekmira changed its name to Arbutus Biopharma and said that it would focus on drugs to treat hepatitis B.

In March 2017 Arbutus signed another license for its liposome delivery technology, this time with Alexion Pharmaceuticals, for delivery of an mRNA drug candidate. This license was terminated in July 2017, when Alexion discontinued preclinical programs outside its core complement franchise.

In 2019, Arbutus began a phase 1 clinical study using AB-506 to treat chronic hepatitis B. The company released preliminary data in July and stopped the trial in October after two patients developed acute hepatitis. Now AB-729 is paving the way for Arbutus, as they recently received the FDA go ahead to pursue phase 2 trials, after having their data voted best in ILC, 2021; after abandoning development of previous investigational agents. AB-836, Arbutus's next generation capsid inhibitor, has shown potential against mutants in its phase 1 trials.

In July 2019, Arbutus Biopharma announced the sale of part of its royalty interest on future global net sales of ONPATTRO, an RNA interference therapeutic currently sold by Alnylam Pharmaceuticals, to OMERS for $20 million.

=== COVID-19 ===
On March 10, 2023, U.S. District Judge Mitchell Goldberg rejected a bid by Moderna to dismiss some of the patent infringement claims brought against the company by Arbutus and its partner, Genevant Sciences.

Moderna settled their lawsuit and will pay Arbutus $950 million upfront and an additional $1.3 billion contingent upon a favorable resolution of Moderna’s Section 1498 appeal.
