= FGI-104 =

Chemical compound

Legal status
- Legal status: US: Investigational New Drug

Identifiers
- IUPAC name: 4-[(7-chloroquinolin-4-yl)amino]-2-(diethylaminomethyl)-6-[4-(hydroxymethyl)-3-methoxyphenyl]phenol
- PubChem CID: 44158960
- ChemSpider: 65322076
- CompTox Dashboard (EPA): DTXSID201028023

Chemical and physical data
- Formula: C_{28}H_{30}ClN_{3}O_{3}
- Molar mass: 492.02 g·mol^{−1}
- 3D model (JSmol): Interactive image
- SMILES: c4cnc1cc(Cl)ccc1c4Nc(cc2CN(CC)CC)cc(c2O)-c(cc3OC)ccc3CO
- InChI: InChI=1S/C28H30ClN3O3/c1-4-32(5-2)16-20-12-22(31-25-10-11-30-26-14-21(29)8-9-23(25)26)15-24(28(20)34)18-6-7-19(17-33)27(13-18)35-3/h6-15,33-34H,4-5,16-17H2,1-3H3,(H,30,31); Key:OFXBJOIYAJBMNY-UHFFFAOYSA-N

FGI-104 is the name of an experimental broad-spectrum antiviral drug, with activity against a range of viruses including hepatitis B, hepatitis C, HIV, Ebola virus, and Venezuelan equine encephalitis virus.

== Mechanism ==
The drug acts by inhibiting the protein TSG101, which transports newly manufactured virions to the exterior of an infected cell, thus breaking the replication cycle of the virus. In pre-clinical studies, FGI-104 has been shown to protect mice from Ebola virus disease.

== See also ==
- FGI-103
- FGI-106
- LJ-001
