= GHP-88310 =

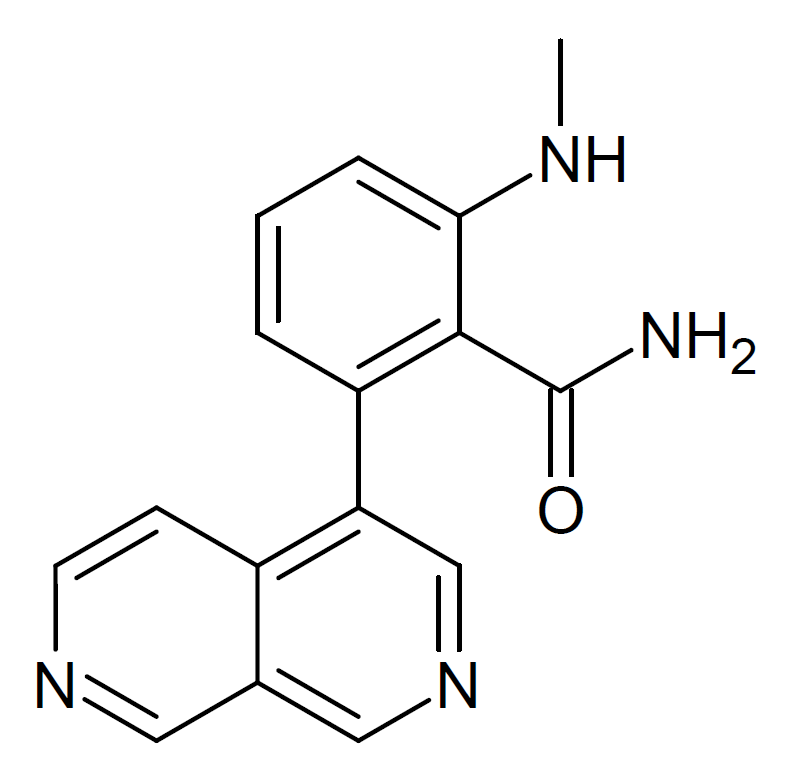

Identifiers
- IUPAC name: 2-(methylamino)-6-(2,7-naphthyridin-4-yl)benzamide
- PubChem CID: 178831901

Chemical and physical data
- Formula: C_{16}H_{14}N_{4}O
- Molar mass: 278.315 g·mol^{−1}
- 3D model (JSmol): Interactive image
- SMILES: CNC1=CC=CC(=C1C(=O)N)C2=C3C=CN=CC3=CN=C2
- InChI: InChI=1S/C16H14N4O/c1-18-14-4-2-3-12(15(14)16(17)21)13-9-20-8-10-7-19-6-5-11(10)13/h2-9,18H,1H3,(H2,17,21); Key:FMLLDKPDZVMHFH-UHFFFAOYSA-N

GHP-88310 (EIDD-3608) is an antiviral drug developed to target the measles morbillivirus, and also shows action against several related orthoparamyxoviruses. Prevalence of measles infection has grown in recent years due to declining vaccination rates, so development of effective antiviral drugs has become increasingly important. GHP-88310 is a broad-spectrum inhibitor of viral polymerases which are required for virus replication, and as well as measles itself, also shows efficacy against human parainfluenza virus type 3, Sendai virus and canine distemper virus in animal models.

== See also ==
- ERDRP-0519
