= Adenosine =

Chemical compound

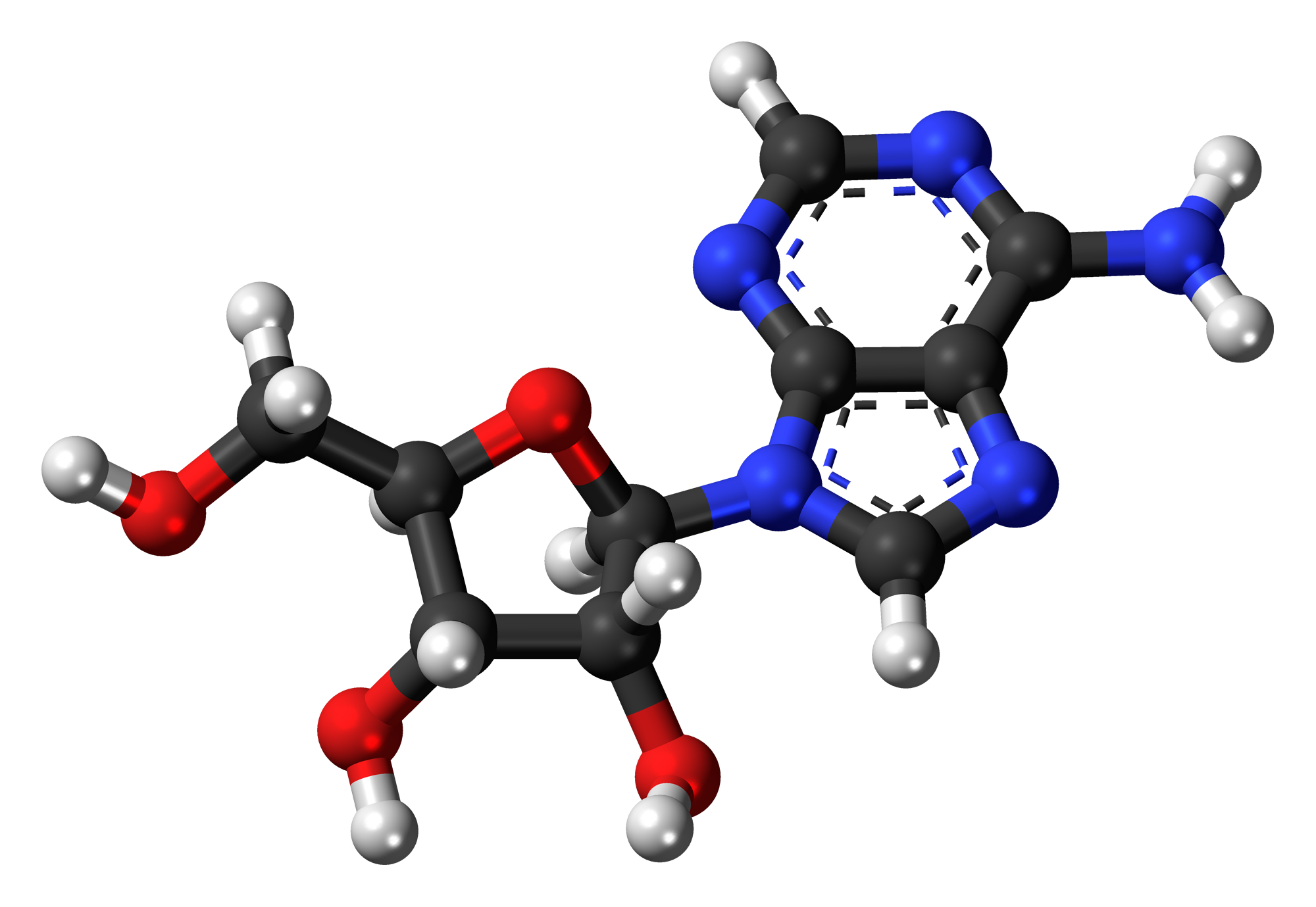

Clinical data
- Trade names: Adenocard; Adenocor; Adenic; Adenoco; Adeno-Jec; Adenoscan; Adenosin; Adrekar; Krenosin
- Other names: SR-96225 (developmental code name)
- AHFS/Drugs.com: Monograph
- Pregnancy category: C; (adenosine may be safe to the fetus in pregnant women)
- Routes of administration: Intravenous
- ATC code: C01EB10 (WHO)

Physiological data
- Source tissues: Primarily liver
- Metabolism: Rapidly converted to inosine and adenosine monophosphate

Legal status
- Legal status: In general: ℞ (Prescription only)

Pharmacokinetic data
- Bioavailability: Rapidly cleared from circulation via enzyme degradation
- Protein binding: No
- Metabolism: Rapidly converted to inosine and adenosine monophosphate
- Elimination half-life: cleared plasma <30 seconds; half-life <10 seconds
- Excretion: can leave cell intact or can be degraded to hypoxanthine, xanthine, and ultimately uric acid

Identifiers
- IUPAC name: (2R,3R,4S,5R)-2-(6-amino-9H-purin-9-yl)-5-(hydroxymethyl)oxolane-3,4-diol
- CAS Number: 58-61-7
- PubChem CID: 60961
- IUPHAR/BPS: 2844
- DrugBank: DB00640
- ChemSpider: 54923
- UNII: K72T3FS567
- KEGG: C00212
- ChEBI: CHEBI:16335
- ChEMBL: ChEMBL477
- CompTox Dashboard (EPA): DTXSID1022558
- ECHA InfoCard: 100.000.354

Chemical and physical data
- Formula: C_{10}H_{13}N_{5}O_{4}
- Molar mass: 267.245 g·mol^{−1}
- 3D model (JSmol): Interactive image
- SMILES: n2c1c(ncnc1n(c2)[C@@H]3O[C@@H]([C@@H](O)[C@H]3O)CO)N
- InChI: InChI=1S/C10H13N5O4/c11-8-5-9(13-2-12-8)15(3-14-5)10-7(18)6(17)4(1-16)19-10/h2-4,6-7,10,16-18H,1H2,(H2,11,12,13)/t4-,6-,7-,10-/m1/s1; Key:OIRDTQYFTABQOQ-KQYNXXCUSA-N

Adenosine (symbol A) is an organic compound that occurs widely in nature in the form of diverse derivatives. The molecule consists of an adenine attached to a ribose via a β-N_{9}-glycosidic bond. Adenosine is one of the four nucleoside building blocks of RNA (and its derivative deoxyadenosine is a building block of DNA), which are essential for all life on Earth. Its derivatives include the energy carriers adenosine mono-, di-, and triphosphate, also known as AMP/ADP/ATP. Cyclic adenosine monophosphate (cAMP) is pervasive in signal transduction. Adenosine is used as an intravenous medication for some cardiac arrhythmias.

Adenosyl (abbreviated Ado or 5'-dAdo) is the chemical group formed by removal of the 5′-hydroxy (OH) group. It is found in adenosylcobalamin (an active form of vitamin B12) and as a radical in the radical SAM enzymes.

== Medical uses ==
=== Supraventricular tachycardia ===
In individuals with supraventricular tachycardia (SVT), adenosine is a first line treatment used to help identify and convert the rhythm.

Certain SVTs can be successfully terminated with adenosine. This includes any re-entrant arrhythmias that require the AV node for the re-entry, e.g., AV reentrant tachycardia (AVRT) and AV nodal reentrant tachycardia (AVNRT). In addition, atrial tachycardia can sometimes be terminated with adenosine.

Fast rhythms of the heart that are confined to the atria (e.g., atrial fibrillation and atrial flutter) or ventricles (e.g., monomorphic ventricular tachycardia), and do not involve the AV node as part of the re-entrant circuit, are not typically converted by adenosine. However, the ventricular response rate is temporarily slowed with adenosine in such cases.

Because of the effects of adenosine on AV node-dependent SVTs, adenosine is considered a class V antiarrhythmic agent. When adenosine is used to cardiovert an abnormal rhythm, it is normal for the heart to enter ventricular asystole for a few seconds. This can be disconcerting to a normally conscious patient, and is associated with angina-like sensations in the chest.

=== Nuclear stress test ===
Adenosine is used as an adjunct to thallium (Tl-201) or technetium (Tc-99m) myocardial perfusion scintigraphy (nuclear stress test) in patients unable to undergo adequate stress testing with exercise.

=== Dosage ===
When used to treat SVT, adenosine is administered intravenously as a rapid bolus (typically 0.10–0.15 mg/kg initially) over 1-2 seconds, followed by a rapid saline flush (often using a 2-way or 3-way stopcock). If the initial dose is ineffective, it may be repeated every 2 minutes with a slightly increased dose (0.05–0.1 mg/kg increments) every 2 minutes up to a maximum total dose of 0.3 mg/kg (not exceeding 12 mg). Due to adenosine's extremely short half-life (less than 10 seconds), it is often injected through a central venous line or a large proximal peripheral vein; administration into lower extremities, PICC lines, or smaller veins may lead to therapeutic failure due to rapid metabolism before reaching the heart. When given to dilate the arteries, such as in a "stress test", the dosage is typically 0.14 mg/kg/min, administered for 4 or 6 minutes, depending on the protocol.

The recommended dose may be increased in patients on theophylline since methylxanthines prevent binding of adenosine at receptor sites. The dose is often decreased in patients on dipyridamole (Persantine) and diazepam (Valium) because adenosine potentiates the effects of these drugs. The recommended dose is also reduced by half in patients presenting congestive heart failure, myocardial infarction, shock, hypoxia, and/or chronic liver disease or chronic kidney disease, and in elderly patients.

== Adverse effects ==
Adverse effects associated with adenosine administration are primarily due to its activation of adenosine receptors on vascular tissue, resulting in vasodilation. Side effects of adenosine include skin flushing, lightheadedness, nausea, sweating, nervousness, numbness, and a sense of impending doom. These effects are typically very short-lived due to adenosine's rapid metabolism and short half-life. Less common, but more serious, cardiovascular effects can occur, such as cardiac arrhythmias (including premature atrial and ventricular contractions and atrioventricular (AV) block), hypotension, cardiac ischemia, and prolonged asystole.

== Drug interactions ==
Dipyridamole potentiates the action of adenosine, requiring the use of lower doses.

Caffeine's principal mode of action is as an antagonist of adenosine receptors in the brain.

Methylxanthines (e.g. caffeine found in coffee, theophylline found in tea, or theobromine found in chocolate) have a purine structure and bind to some of the same receptors as adenosine. Methylxanthines act as competitive antagonists of adenosine and can blunt its pharmacological effects. Individuals taking large quantities of methylxanthines may require increased doses of adenosine.

Caffeine acts by blocking binding of adenosine to the adenosine A_{1} receptor, which enhances release of the neurotransmitter acetylcholine. Caffeine also increases cyclic AMP levels through nonselective inhibition of phosphodiesterase. "Caffeine has a three-dimensional structure similar to that of adenosine," which allows it to bind and block its receptors.

Alcohol can increase extracellular adenosine levels.

== Contraindications ==
Common contraindications for adenosine include

- Asthma, traditionally considered an absolute contraindication. This is being contested, and it is now considered a relative contraindication (however, selective adenosine antagonists are being investigated for use in treatment of asthma)

== Pharmacological effects ==
Adenosine is an endogenous purine nucleoside that modulates many physiological processes. Cellular signaling by adenosine occurs through four known adenosine receptor subtypes (A_{1}, A_{2A}, A_{2B}, and A_{3}).

Extracellular adenosine concentrations from normal cells are approximately 300 nM; however, in response to cellular damage (e.g., in inflammatory or ischemic tissue), these concentrations are quickly elevated (600–1,200 nM). Thus, in regard to stress or injury, the function of adenosine is primarily that of cytoprotection preventing tissue damage during instances of hypoxia, ischemia, and seizure activity. Activation of A_{2A} receptors produces a constellation of responses that in general can be classified as anti-inflammatory. Enzymatic production of adenosine can be anti-inflammatory or immunosuppressive.

=== Adenosine receptors ===
All adenosine receptor subtypes (A_{1}, A_{2A}, A_{2B}, and A_{3}) are G-protein-coupled receptors. The four receptor subtypes are further classified based on their ability to either stimulate or inhibit adenylate cyclase activity. The A_{1} receptors couple to G_{i/o} and decrease cAMP levels, while the A_{2} adenosine receptors couple to G_{s}, which stimulates adenylate cyclase activity. In addition, A_{1} receptors couple to G_{o}, which has been reported to mediate adenosine inhibition of Ca^{2+} conductance, whereas A_{2B} and A_{3} receptors also couple to G_{q} and stimulate phospholipase activity. Researchers at Cornell University have recently shown adenosine receptors to be key in opening the blood-brain barrier (BBB). Mice dosed with adenosine have shown increased transport across the BBB of amyloid plaque antibodies and prodrugs associated with Parkinson's disease, Alzheimer's, multiple sclerosis, and cancers of the central nervous system.

=== Ghrelin/growth hormone secretagogue receptor ===
Adenosine is an endogenous agonist of the ghrelin/growth hormone secretagogue receptor. However, while it is able to increase appetite, unlike other agonists of this receptor, adenosine is unable to induce the secretion of growth hormone and increase its plasma levels.

=== Mechanism of action ===
When it is administered intravenously, adenosine causes transient heart block in the atrioventricular (AV) node. This is mediated via the A_{1} receptor, inhibiting adenylyl cyclase, reducing cAMP and so causing cell hyperpolarization by increasing K^{+} efflux via inward rectifier K^{+} channels, subsequently inhibiting Ca^{2+} current. It also causes endothelial-dependent relaxation of smooth muscle as is found inside the artery walls. This causes dilation of the "normal" segments of arteries, i.e. where the endothelium is not separated from the tunica media by atherosclerotic plaque. This feature allows physicians to use adenosine to test for blockages in the coronary arteries, by exaggerating the difference between the normal and abnormal segments.

The administration of adenosine also reduces blood flow to coronary arteries past the occlusion. Other coronary arteries dilate when adenosine is administered while the segment past the occlusion is already maximally dilated, which is a process called coronary steal. This leads to less blood reaching the ischemic tissue, which in turn produces the characteristic chest pain.

== Metabolism ==
Adenosine used as a second messenger can be the result of de novo purine biosynthesis via adenosine monophosphate (AMP), though it is possible other pathways exist.

When adenosine enters the circulation, it is broken down by adenosine deaminase, which is present in red blood cells and the vessel wall.

Dipyridamole, an inhibitor of adenosine nucleoside transporter, allows adenosine to accumulate in the blood stream. This causes an increase in coronary vasodilatation.

Adenosine deaminase deficiency is a known cause of immunodeficiency.

== Research ==
=== Viruses ===
The adenosine analog NITD008 has been reported to directly inhibit the recombinant RNA-dependent RNA polymerase of the dengue virus by terminating its RNA chain synthesis. This interaction suppresses peak viremia and rise in cytokines and prevents lethality in infected animals, raising the possibility of a new treatment for this flavivirus. The 7-deaza-adenosine analog has been shown to inhibit the replication of the hepatitis C virus. BCX4430 is protective against Ebola and Marburg viruses. Such adenosine analogs are potentially clinically useful since they can be taken orally.

=== Anti-inflammatory properties ===
Adenosine is believed to be an anti-inflammatory agent at the A_{2A} receptor. Topical treatment of adenosine to foot wounds in diabetes mellitus has been shown in lab animals to drastically increase tissue repair and reconstruction. Topical administration of adenosine for use in wound-healing deficiencies and diabetes mellitus in humans is currently under clinical investigation.

Methotrexate's anti-inflammatory effect may be due to its stimulation of adenosine release.

=== Central nervous system ===
In general, adenosine has an inhibitory effect in the central nervous system (CNS). Caffeine's stimulatory effects are credited primarily (although not entirely) to its capacity to block adenosine receptors, thereby reducing the inhibitory tonus of adenosine in the CNS. This reduction in adenosine activity leads to increased activity of the neurotransmitters dopamine and glutamate. Experimental evidence suggests that adenosine and adenosine agonists can activate Trk receptor phosphorylation through a mechanism that requires the adenosine A_{2A} receptor. Adenosine in the brain acts through three major receptor subtypes—A1, A2A, and A3—distributed across various neuronal and glial populations. Activation of neuronal A1 receptors generally exerts inhibitory effects, contributing to synaptic regulation. In a preclinical knock-in model of Alzheimer's disease, neuronal hyperexcitability during the asymptomatic stage has been shown to originate at the synaptic compartment and is associated with a deficient adenosinergic tone, suggesting that impaired adenosine signaling may contribute to early synaptic dysfunction.

=== Hair ===
Adenosine has been shown to promote thickening of hair on people with thinning hair. A 2013 study compared topical adenosine with minoxidil in male androgenetic alopecia, finding it was as potent as minoxidil (in overall treatment outcomes) but with higher satisfaction rate with patients due to "faster prevention of hair loss and appearance of the newly grown hairs" (further trials were called for to clarify the findings).

=== Sleep ===
Adenosine is a key factor in regulating the body's sleep-wake cycle. Adenosine levels build up in the brain during periods of wakefulness, causing a need to sleep when levels become too high, and lowers during periods of sleep, giving a sensation of restedness when waking. Higher adenosine levels correlate with a stronger feeling of sleepiness, also known as sleep drive or sleep pressure. Cognitive behavioral therapy for insomnia (CBT-I), which is considered one of the most effective treatments for insomnia, utilizes short-term sleep deprivation to raise and regulate adenosine levels in the body, for the intended promotion of consistent and sustained sleep in the long term.

A principal component of cannabis delta-9-tetrahydrocannabinol (THC) and the endocannabinoid anandamide (AEA) induces sleep in rats by increasing adenosine levels in the basal forebrain. These components also significantly increase slow-wave sleep during the sleep cycle, mediated by CB1 receptor activation. These findings identify a potential therapeutic use of cannabinoids to induce sleep in conditions where sleep may be severely attenuated.

== Vasodilation ==
It also plays a role in regulation of blood flow to various organs through vasodilation.

== See also ==
- Adenosine receptor
- Adenosine reuptake inhibitor
- List of growth hormone secretagogues
