= Faith and Globalisation Initiative =

The Faith and Globalisation Initiative (FGI) is an international group of universities created in 2008 by former British prime minister Tony Blair and his Faith Foundation. The Faith and Globalisation Initiative is "bringing together some of the world's leading research Universities to form a global network focusing on the emerging field of faith and globalisation".

== History and key objectives ==
In 2008 Yale University was the first university the Foundation started working with and in 10 months it expanded the network to include the National University of Singapore, Durham University and McGill University. Two years later the Foundation developed an associate university programme which seeks to foster the study of faith and globalisation in a broad range of higher education institutions.

The institutions were selected on the basis of their ability to contribute to the Initiative, but also to ensure that they have a geographic and cultural spread that lends multiple perspectives to the discipline.

Key objectives of the FGI are the following:

- Develop multi-disciplinary teaching courses on Faith and Globalisation
- Advance knowledge in the field of Faith and Globalisation
- Disseminate university research related to Faith and Globalisation
- Engage policy-makers and the general public on the topic of Faith and Globalisation
- Support the implementation and development of the Foundation's Face to Faith and Faiths Act projects.

== Universities ==
As of January 2011, the participating members of the Faith and Globalisation Network of Universities are:

Lead Universities:

- Yale University
- McGill University
- Tecnológico de Monterrey
- University of Western Australia
- National University of Singapore
- Peking University
- University of Hong Kong
- Fourah Bay College, University of Sierra Leone
- Banaras Hindu University
- University of Prishtina
- American University in Kosovo
- National University 'Kiev-Mohyla Academy'
- Philippines Consortium (consisting of Ateneo de Manila, Ateneo de Zamboanga, Notre Dame (Cotabato) and Mindanao State University)

Associate Universities:

- Wheaton College
- Pepperdine University
- Santa Clara University
- St. Mary's University College, Twickenham
- Winchester University
- Pwani University College
