= FGI-103 =

Chemical compound

Legal status
- Legal status: US: Investigational New Drug

Identifiers
- IUPAC name: 2-[(E)-2-(5-carbamimidoyl-1-benzofuran-2-yl)ethenyl]-3H-benzimidazole-5-carboximidamide
- CAS Number: 907169-69-1
- PubChem CID: 5477931
- ChemSpider: 4585571
- UNII: B14V493D7B

Chemical and physical data
- Formula: C_{19}H_{16}N_{6}O
- Molar mass: 344.378 g·mol^{−1}
- 3D model (JSmol): Interactive image
- SMILES: N=C(N)c4ccc3oc(C=Cc2nc1cc(C(=N)N)ccc1[nH]2)cc3c4
- InChI: InChI=1S/C19H16N6O/c20-18(21)10-2-5-16-12(7-10)8-13(26-16)3-6-17-24-14-4-1-11(19(22)23)9-15(14)25-17/h1-9H,(H3,20,21)(H3,22,23)(H,24,25)/b6-3+; Key:OOKWWPFCCCMWIS-ZZXKWVIFSA-N

FGI-103 is an antiviral drug developed as a potential treatment for the filoviruses Ebola virus and Marburg virus. In tests on mice FGI-103 was effective against both Ebola and Marburg viruses when administered up to 48 hours after infection. The mechanism of action of FGI-103 has however not yet been established, as it was found not to be acting by any of the known mechanisms used by similar antiviral drugs.

== See also ==
- FGI-104
- FGI-106
- LJ-001
