= TKM-Ebola =

Experimental antiviral drug for Ebola disease that failed

TKM-Ebola was an experimental antiviral drug for Ebola disease that was developed by Arbutus Biopharma (formerly Tekmira Pharmaceuticals Corp.) in Vancouver, Canada. The drug candidate was formerly known as Ebola-SNALP.

TKM-Ebola is a combination of small interfering RNAs targeting three of the seven proteins in Ebola virus: Zaire Ebola L polymerase, Zaire Ebola membrane-associated protein (VP24), and Zaire Ebola polymerase complex protein (VP35). By down-regulating these three proteins, TKM-Ebola inhibits virus replication and eliminates the infection. The drug was effective in rhesus monkeys infected with Ebola. After the Ebola outbreak in West Africa in 2014, the new variant responsible for it was isolated from several Ebola virus families and the specific genomic sequence was determined. The company re-designed TKM-Ebola and renamed it as "TKM-Ebola-Guinea".

In January 2014, Tekmira started a Phase I clinical trial of TKM-Ebola to assess its safety in healthy people with a dose of 0.24 mg/kg/day for seven day treatments. The FDA placed the trial on clinical hold in July 2014 to assess results, after some subjects had flu-like responses. In August, the FDA changed the status to "partial hold", allowing the drug to be used under expanded access in people infected with Ebola but with the Phase I trial still suspended. In April 2015 the FDA allowed the study to resume at a lower dose.

A Phase II trial started on 11 March 2015 in Sierra Leone, West Africa and stopped enrolling new subjects on 19 June 2015 after it appeared not to work. In July 2015 the company announced it was changing its name to Arbutus, suspending development of the drug for Ebola and changing its focus to developing treatments for hepatitis B virus.

== See also ==
- Atoltivimab/maftivimab/odesivimab, treatment of Zaire ebolavirus (Ebola virus)
- Favipiravir
- ZMapp
