= JK-05 =

Chemical compound

Legal status
- Legal status: US: Investigational New Drug

Identifiers
- CAS Number: 1911641-25-2

JK-05 is a broad-spectrum antiviral drug developed by the Chinese company Sihuan Pharmaceutical along with the Chinese Academy of Military Medical Sciences. It is reported to act as an inhibitor of the viral enzyme RNA polymerase, which is essential for viral replication. In tests on mice, JK-05 was claimed to show efficacy against a range of RNA viruses, including influenza, Ebola virus, and yellow fever, as well as several arenaviruses and bunyaviruses. The chemical structure of JK-05 has not been disclosed as of October 2014, but it is claimed to be a small molecule drug with a comparatively simple structure, which should be readily amenable to synthesis scale-up for mass production if testing is successful. The drug is, however, admitted to be similar to the Japanese anti-influenza drug favipiravir, developed by Fujifilm Holdings Corp, which has been used effectively to treat patients with Ebola. In addition, WHO committee members mentioned that the drug is a copy product of favipiravir, because patents of favipiravir were already registered in 2006 in China. The drug has been given preliminary approval by the Chinese authorities to be available for Chinese health workers involved in combating the 2014 West African Ebola outbreak, or if Ebola were to spread into mainland China. Several other Chinese developed antiviral drugs with anti-Ebola activity have also been disclosed, but have not progressed so far through development as JK-05.

== See also ==
- ERDRP-0519
- Sofosbuvir
