= Brincidofovir =

Antiviral drug

Clinical data
- Trade names: Tembexa
- Other names: CMX001; Cidofovir-HDP; hexadecyloxypropyl-cidofovir
- License data: US DailyMed: Brincidofovir
- Routes of administration: By mouth
- ATC code: J05AB17 (WHO)

Legal status
- Legal status: CA: ℞-only; US: ℞-only

Identifiers
- IUPAC name: ({[(2S)-1-(4-amino-2-oxo-1,2-dihydropyrimidin-1-yl)-3-hydroxypropan-2-yl]oxy}methyl)[3-(hexadecyloxy)propoxy]phosphinic acid
- CAS Number: 444805-28-1; Sodium salt: 496765-79-8
- PubChem CID: 483477
- DrugBank: DB12151; Sodium salt: DBSALT002145
- ChemSpider: 424003; Sodium salt: 21259112
- UNII: 6794O900AX; Sodium salt: 8UN8SA9Z5C
- KEGG: D10547
- ChEMBL: ChEMBL203321
- CompTox Dashboard (EPA): DTXSID60196190

Chemical and physical data
- Formula: C_{27}H_{52}N_{3}O_{7}P
- Molar mass: 561.701 g·mol^{−1}
- 3D model (JSmol): Interactive image
- SMILES: CCCCCCCCCCCCCCCCOCCCOP(=O)(O)CO[C@H](CO)Cn1ccc(N)nc1=O
- InChI: InChI=1S/C27H52N3O7P/c1-2-3-4-5-6-7-8-9-10-11-12-13-14-15-19-35-20-16-21-37-38(33,34)24-36-25(23-31)22-30-18-17-26(28)29-27(30)32/h17-18,25,31H,2-16,19-24H2,1H3,(H,33,34)(H2,28,29,32)/t25-/m0/s1; Key:WXJFKKQWPMNTIM-VWLOTQADSA-N

Brincidofovir, sold under the brand name Tembexa, is an antiviral drug which was used to treat smallpox, prior to the global eradication of the disease in 1980. Brincidofovir is a prodrug of cidofovir. Conjugated to a lipid, the compound is designed to release cidofovir intracellularly, allowing for higher intracellular and lower plasma concentrations of cidofovir, effectively increasing its activity against dsDNA viruses, as well as oral bioavailability.

The most common side effects include diarrhea, nausea, vomiting, and abdominal pain. It carries an FDA-mandated black box warning of an increased risk of death with extended use. Brincidofovir was approved for medical use in the United States in June 2021.

== Medical uses ==
Brincidofovir is indicated for the treatment of human smallpox disease caused by the variola virus.

== Mechanism of action ==
Brincidofovir is a prodrug that is composed of cidofovir conjugated with a lipid molecule. The lipid aspect of the molecule takes on the action of endogenous lysophosphatidyl choline, which then is able to enter cells in the body which are infected with smallpox. Once the infected cell takes in the drug, the drug cleaves to generate cidofovir. Cidofovir is then consequently phosphorylated to yield cidofovir diphosphate, which is the active drug. Cidofovir diphosphate inhibits the variola virus' DNA polymerase-mediated DNA synthesis. The drug acts as an acyclic nucleotide and incorporates itself into the viral DNA chain, which then stops viral DNA synthesis.

== Pharmacokinetics ==
The oral bioavailability of brincidofovir is 13.4% as a tablet and 16.8% in a suspension. The metabolism of the drug is as such: once the drug enters the target infected cell, brincidofovir's phosphodiester bond is then hydrolyzed to generate cidofovir which is then phosphorylated to the active cidofovir diphosphate. The volume of distribution of the drug is 1230 L.

== History ==
Because smallpox is eradicated, the effectiveness of brincidofovir was studied in animals infected with viruses that are closely related to the variola virus. Effectiveness was determined by measuring animals' survival at the end of the studies.

Safety information to support approval of brincidofovir was derived from clinical trials of the drug for a non-smallpox indication, primarily from patients who received hematopoietic stem cell transplants.

The U.S. Food and Drug Administration (FDA) granted the application for brincidofovir priority review, fast track, and orphan drug designations. The FDA approved brincidofovir under the agency's Animal Rule, which allows findings from adequate and well-controlled animal efficacy studies to serve as the basis of an approval when it is not feasible or ethical to conduct efficacy trials in humans.

== Expanded access ethical considerations ==
Brincidofovir was the subject of widespread social media campaigning in 2014, which was then picked up by national news sources about a boy with an adenovirus infection following a bone marrow transplant. The family requested legal access to the still-unapproved drug outside of any clinical trial, and Chimerix initially denied the request. After a short and intense media campaign, Chimerix got permission from the FDA to start a limited open-label trial which allowed the boy to receive the drug. This media event sparked a debate on the ethics of using social media, the allocation of limited resources of a small company, and the emphasis on the individual over the group. The new use of any drug has the potential to interfere with the process to get the drug approved and widely marketed, through means such as consuming limited staff time that may be needed elsewhere – staff time that has the potential to save thousands of lives in the long-term, rather than one life now – overwhelming manufacturing capabilities, or by causing adverse effects or even death. These adverse events are more likely during these programs, because the people seeking access are usually much sicker than most, and problems experienced by these people can result in an unfavorable and inaccurate perception of the drug's safety profile. In this case, the boy recovered from the infection in 2014, and died in 2016 from complications of cancer.

Brincidofovir is one of several experimental drugs administered to a small number of patients to treat Ebola virus disease during the Western African Ebola epidemic in 2014. The WHO published a report on the ethics of using unregistered interventions to treat Ebola, where they concluded that "In the particular context of the current Ebola outbreak in West Africa, it is ethically acceptable to offer unproven interventions that have shown promising results in the laboratory and in animal models but have not yet been evaluated for safety and efficacy in humans as potential treatment or prevention."

== Research ==
Brincidofovir is under investigation for the treatment of cytomegalovirus, adenovirus, poxvirus, and ebolavirus infections. It has been used off-label for the treatment of monkeypox.

=== Adenovirus and cytomegalovirus ===
As of 2014, brincidofovir is in Phase III clinical trials for use in humans against cytomegalovirus and adenovirus. Preliminary safety data from a database of 1000 patients supported progression into later phase trials, Chimerix announced in December 2015 that the Phase III trials for use of the drug in preventing cytomegalovirus infection in stem cell transplant patients had failed, and in February 2016 shut down two other late-stage trials for use of the drug in preventing infection after kidney transplants. Brincidofovir is not yet FDA approved for adenovirus or cytomegalovirus due to lack of efficacy in clinical trials. In a trial of brincidofovir for CMV prophylaxis in stem cell transplant patients, brincidofovir was associated with a 15.5% week 24 all-cause mortality compared with 10.1% among placebo recipients. Additionally brincidofovir was associated with increased serious adverse events (57.1% versus 37.6%) compared with placebo. Brincidofovir was initially offered via an FDA expanded access trial; however as of 9 May 2019, Chimerix discontinued clinical trials of brincidofovir for the treatment of adenovirus and discontinued the expanded access program in 2019.

=== Ebola ===
After initial studies by the Centers for Disease Control and Prevention (CDC, Atlanta, Georgia, US) in cell culture models, on 6 October 2014, Chimerix received an FDA authorization for emergency investigational new drug applications of brincidofovir for the treatment of Ebola virus disease. Brincidofovir was administered to the first patient diagnosed in the Ebola virus disease outbreak in the US in 2014. The patient was given the drug starting six days after hospital admission when he was already critically ill; he died four days later. Brincidofovir was also given to Ebola patient Ashoka Mukpo at the Nebraska Medical Center, who had developed the disease and then was pronounced Ebola-free and released from the center on 22 October 2014.

In October 2014, Chimerix reported it had been given approval by the FDA to start Phase 2 trials in patients infected with ebolaviruses for brincidofovir's safety, tolerability, and efficacy. Organised by a team of scientists at the University of Oxford, including Peter Horby, Jake Dunning, Laura Merson and Trudie Lang, a trial commenced during January 2015 in Liberia, but was subsequently discontinued. Because of a lack of suitable subjects in Liberia, Oxford University and Médecins Sans Frontières planned to extend the trial to Sierra Leone, where there were still Ebola cases; but on 30 January 2015, the manufacturer decided to withdraw support for the trial and end discussion of future trials.

=== Animals ===
In animal trials brincidofovir has shown activity against cytomegalovirus, adenoviruses, BK virus, poxviruses, and herpes simplex viruses. Brincidofovir appears to have potential for the treatment of Ebola virus disease, which is somewhat paradoxical, as ebolaviruses are RNA viruses and thus do not contain DNA as the above-mentioned viruses.
