= George Hirst (virologist) =

American virologist and science administrator

George K. Hirst

George Keble Hirst, M.D. (March 2, 1909 – January 22, 1994) was an American virologist and science administrator who was among the first to study the molecular biology and genetics of animal viruses, especially influenza virus. He directed the Public Health Research Institute in New York City (1956–1981), and was also the founding editor-in-chief of Virology, the first English-language journal to focus on viruses. He is particularly known for inventing the hemagglutination assay, a simple method for quantifying viruses, and adapting it into the hemagglutination inhibition assay, which measures virus-specific antibodies in serum. He was the first to discover that viruses can contain enzymes, and the first to propose that virus genomes can consist of discontinuous segments. The New York Times described him as "a pioneer in molecular virology."

== Education and career ==
Hirst was born in Eau Claire, Wisconsin, USA, but his family soon moved to Lewistown, Montana. He studied at Hobart College in Geneva, New York, and later at Yale University, New Haven, Connecticut, from which he gained his first degree and medical degree (1933). He worked at the Rockefeller Institute for Medical Research in New York City in 1936–1940, under the supervision of Homer Swift and Rebecca Lancefield, and then moved to the Rockefeller Foundation's International Health Division laboratories in 1940. There he combined research in collaboration with Frank Horsfall, Edwin D. Kilbourne and others with his army service, as a member of the Armed Forces Epidemiological Board's Commission on Influenza.

After the Second World War, Hirst joined the Public Health Research Institute in New York City, which had been established in 1942, where he remained until his retirement in 1983. He became head of the Infectious Diseases and Virology Divisions, and in 1956 succeeded L. Whittington Gorham as director of the institute, a position he held for nearly 25 years until 1981. During his tenure, he superintended its expansion and move to a new location on 26th Street and First Avenue. He also held a teaching position at the New York University School of Medicine.

== Research ==
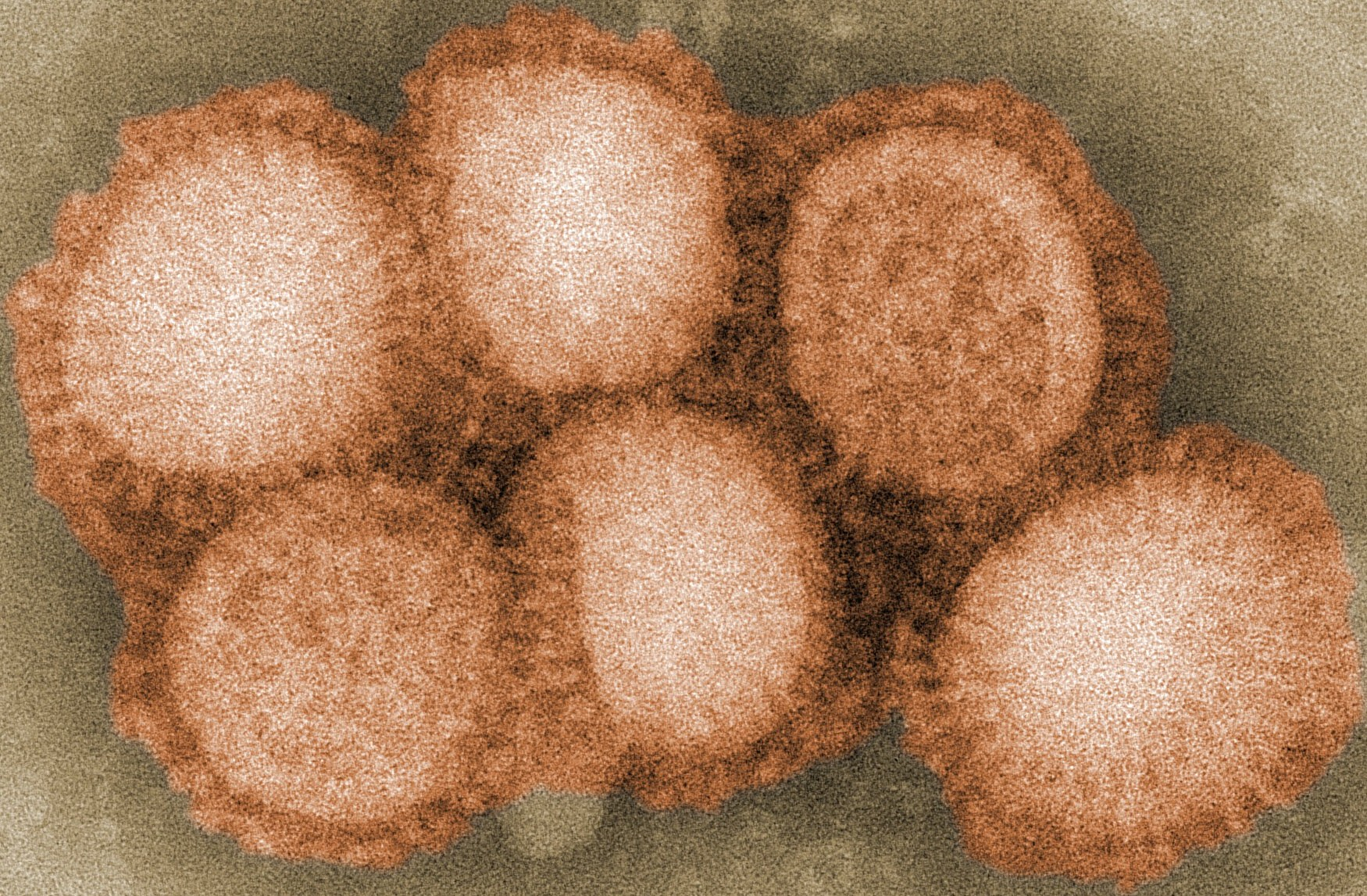
Influenza virus, the focus of much of Hirst's research

Hirst's earliest research, in the 1930s, was on bacteria, including pneumococci and streptococci, in collaboration with Lancefield and others. In 1940, at the Rockefeller Foundation, he started to work on influenza viruses – enveloped RNA viruses infecting humans, birds and other vertebrates – which were the focus of much of his subsequent research. Human influenza virus had first been isolated just a few years earlier. Later, Hirst also studied other vertebrate RNA viruses, including poliovirus, mumps and Newcastle disease virus. Although viruses had been shown to infect animals in 1898, research on animal viruses was much less advanced in the 1940s and 1950s than that on plant viruses and bacteriophages, which were easier to handle experimentally.

=== Hemagglutination ===
In 1941, Hirst discovered that adding influenza virus particles to red blood cells caused them to agglutinate or stick together forming a lattice, a phenomenon called hemagglutination. Hemagglutination provided a convenient method of diagnosing influenza in the laboratory, which had previously been performed by cultivating the virus in ferrets. Hirst developed this reaction into the hemagglutination assay, which allows the amount of virus in the sample to be measured. This technique is rapid, accurate and convenient, and later proved to be applicable to many other viruses. Wolfgang Joklik cites the discovery of hemagglutination as one of the "early epoch-making discoveries in virology," stating that it made influenza virus "the first mammalian virus whose replication could be studied biochemically." Although Hirst did not know this at the time, hemagglutination is caused by the influenza virus hemagglutinin (a glycoprotein on the viral envelope) binding to sialic acid on the surface of the red blood cell; the same mechanism is central to the influenza virus entering its host cell.

=== Hemagglutination inhibition and vaccination ===
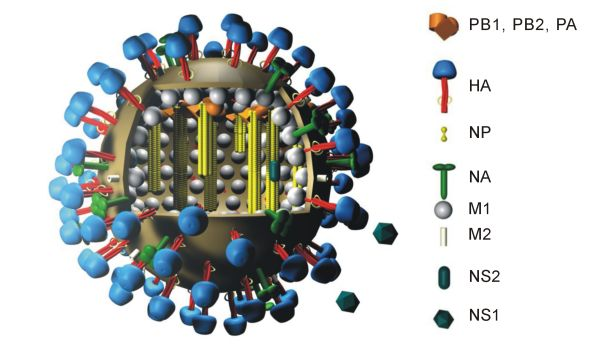
Diagram of influenza virus, showing the hemagglutinin (HA) and neuraminidase (NA)

He soon realised that the hemagglutination assay could easily be adapted to measure the levels of antibody specific to the virus strain in human serum: any antibodies present bind to the influenza virus particles, prevent them from crosslinking red blood cells and so inhibit hemagglutination. This hemagglutination inhibition assay (HIA) can be applied to many other viruses carrying a hemagglutinin molecule, including rubella, measles, mumps, parainfluenza, adenoviruses, polyomaviruses and arboviruses, and is still widely used in influenza surveillance and vaccine testing. Hannah Hoag, writing in Nature Medicine in 2013, describes the assay as "the gold-standard serologic test to type influenza antibodies in humans and animals."

HIA is "a powerful epidemiological tool," according to virologist Vincent Racaniello, and Hirst explored its application to epidemiological studies. He was one of several researchers who developed and trialed inactivated influenza vaccines in the mid-1940s, and he applied HIA to the study of antibody responses to vaccination.

=== Neuraminidase and the virus receptor ===
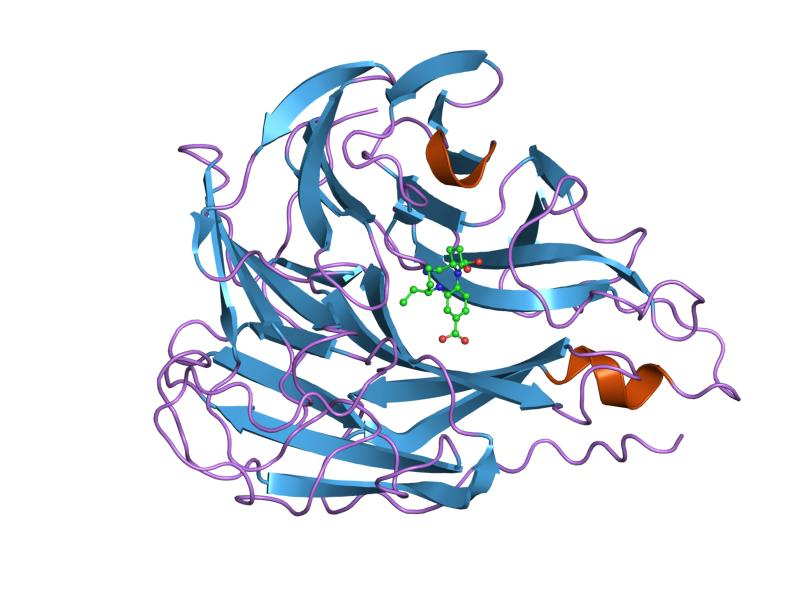
Influenza neuraminidase bound to an inhibitor

Hirst noticed that hemagglutination tended to wear off over time, and in 1942, he discovered that influenza virus has an intrinsic enzymatic activity that can release the virus from its attachment to red blood cells. This was a ground-breaking discovery, as previously a key distinction between viruses and bacteria had been that viruses were believed to lack enzymes. Hirst demonstrated that red blood cells once de-agglutinated could not be re-agglutinated, and correctly deduced that the enzyme destroys a receptor for the virus on the red blood cells. This enzyme, then referred to as the "receptor-destroying enzyme" was later shown to be the influenza neuraminidase, another viral envelope glycoprotein, which acts as a sialidase. Like hemagglutinin, neuraminidase is essential for the influenza life cycle, being required for the progeny virus to leave the host cell. Neuraminidase is the target of the neuraminidase inhibitor class of antiviral drugs, which include oseltamivir (Tamiflu) and zanamivir (Relenza).

Hirst subsequently found that influenza virus interacts with a similar receptor on its target cell during infection, providing a model for the initiation of viral infection that turned out to apply to all viruses. He continued to investigate the nature of this cellular receptor during the 1940s and 1950s, correctly proposing in 1948 that the receptor might be one or more mucoproteins.

=== Segmented influenza genome ===
Starting in the late 1940s, Hirst carried out pioneering research into the genetics of animal viruses. His team built on Frank Macfarlane Burnet's work on recombination in influenza virus, carrying out a series of experiments that led Hirst to conclude in 1962 that influenza's genome must consist of several separate fragments, "a truly revolutionary idea at the time," according to R. Walter Schlesinger and Allan Granoff. Influenza viruses are now known to have eight such segments, and the segmentation of its genome facilitates the exchange of segments between different influenza viruses, causing antigenic shift which can result in pandemics. Segmented genomes are also found in many other viruses.

== Virology journal ==
Hirst founded the journal Virology in 1955, together with bacteriophage specialist Salvador Luria and plant virologist Lindsay Black. It was the first journal in the English language to specialise in publishing research into viruses, and it united basic science research across viruses infecting all types of host, a lifelong objective of Hirst's. The founding editor-in-chief, he headed up the journal for 21 years, until 1975. On his retirement, he was praised by his co-editors:

the discipline of virology owes him a large debt of gratitude for the clear vision, unfailing sense of fairness and uncompromising dedication to scientific excellence with which he guided Virology through the first 21 years of its existence. His hand at the helm will be sorely missed; but he has defined the journal's objectives and established its style.

== Awards and honors ==
Hirst gave the 1948 Harvey Lecture of the New York Academy of Medicine on the topic of "The nature of hemagglutination by viruses" and, in 1961, the inaugural Pfizer Lecture in Virology at the Institute of Virology in Glasgow, UK, on "Development of virology as an independent science". In 1966, he was elected to membership of the National Academy of Sciences and in 1975, to the American Academy of Arts and Sciences. He was awarded the Academy Medal of the New York Academy of Medicine "for distinguished contributions in biomedical science" in 1975.

== Character and personal life ==
His colleague Edwin Kilbourne described Hirst as "a scientist's scientist—a virologist's virologist" with an "incredible" variety of expertise and an "insatiable curiosity," who pursued the underlying explanation for his experimental findings with tenacity. According to Kilbourne, he was very private person who did not seek publicity. His non-scientific pursuits included music – he was both a musician and a musicologist – gardening, and the appreciation of nature.

Hirst married Charlotte Hart in 1937, and the couple had four sons and a daughter. In retirement he moved to Palo Alto, California. His wife predeceased him in 1990.

== Key papers ==
- Hirst GK (1962). "Genetic recombination with Newcastle disease virus, polioviruses, and influenza". Cold Spring Harbor Symposia on Quantitative Biology. 27: 303–309. doi:10.1101/sqb.1962.027.001.028. PMID 13954778.
- Gotlieb T, Hirst GK (1954). "The experimental production of combination forms of virus. III. The formation of doubly antigenic particles from influenza A and B virus and a study of the ability of individual particles of X virus to yield two separate strains". Journal of Experimental Medicine. 99 (4): 307–320. doi:10.1084/jem.99.4.307. PMC 2136233. PMID 13152278.
- Hirst GK (1948). "The nature of the virus receptors of red cells; evidence on the chemical nature of the virus receptors of red cells and of the existence of a closely analogous substance in normal serum". Journal of Experimental Medicine. 87 (4): 301–314. doi:10.1084/jem.87.4.301. PMC 2135779. PMID 18904216.
- Hirst GK (1943). "Adsorption of influenza virus on cells of the respiratory tract". Journal of Experimental Medicine. 78 (2): 99–109. doi:10.1084/jem.78.2.99. PMC 2135394. PMID 19871317.
- Hirst GK, Rickard ER, Whitman L, Horsfall FL, Jr (1942). "Antibody response of human beings following vaccination with influenza viruses". Journal of Experimental Medicine. 75 (5): 495–511. doi:10.1084/jem.75.5.495. PMC 2135266. PMID 19871201.
- Hirst GK (1942). "The quantitative determination of influenza virus and antibodies by means of red cell agglutination". Journal of Experimental Medicine. 75 (1): 49–64. doi:10.1084/jem.75.1.49. PMC 2135212. PMID 19871167.
- Hirst GK (1941). "The agglutination of red blood cells by allantoic fluid of chick embryos infected with influenza virus". Science. 94 (2427): 22–23. doi:10.1126/science.94.2427.22. PMID 17777315.
