= Haemagglutination activity domain =

haemagglutination activity domain
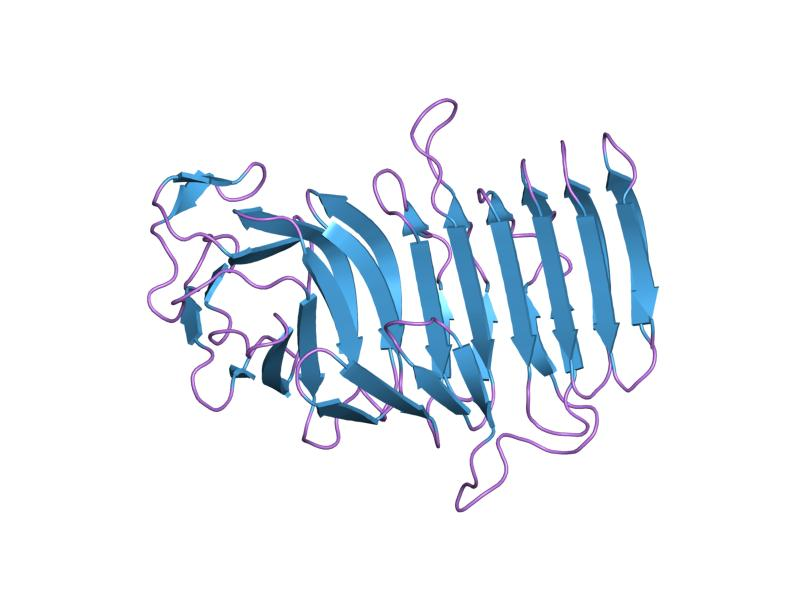
- crystal structure of filamentous hemagglutinin secretion domain

Identifiers
- Symbol: Haemagg_act
- Pfam: PF05860
- Pfam clan: CL0268
- InterPro: IPR008638
- SCOP2: 1rwr / SCOPe / SUPFAM
Available protein structures:
- Pfam: structures / ECOD
- PDB: RCSB PDB; PDBe; PDBj
- PDBsum: structure summary

In molecular biology, the haemagglutination activity domain is a conserved protein domain found near the N terminus of a number of large, repetitive bacterial proteins, including many proteins of over 2500 amino acids. A number of the members of this family have been designated adhesins, filamentous haemagglutinins, haem/haemopexin-binding protein, etc. Members generally have a signal sequence, then an intervening region, then the region described in this entry. Following this region, proteins typically have regions rich in repeats but may show no homology between the repeats of one member and the repeats of another. This domain is suggested to be a carbohydrate-dependent haemagglutination activity site.

In Bordetella pertussis, the infectious agent in childhood whooping cough, filamentous haemagglutinin (FHA) is a surface-exposed and secreted protein that acts as a major virulence attachment factor, functioning as both a primary adhesin and an immunomodulator to bind the bacterial to cells of the respiratory epithelium. The FHA molecule has a globular head that consists of two domains: a shaft and a flexible tail. Its sequence contains two regions of tandem 19-residue repeats, where the repeat motif consists of short beta-strands separated by beta-turns.
