= Hemagglutinin =

Substance that causes red blood cells to agglutinate

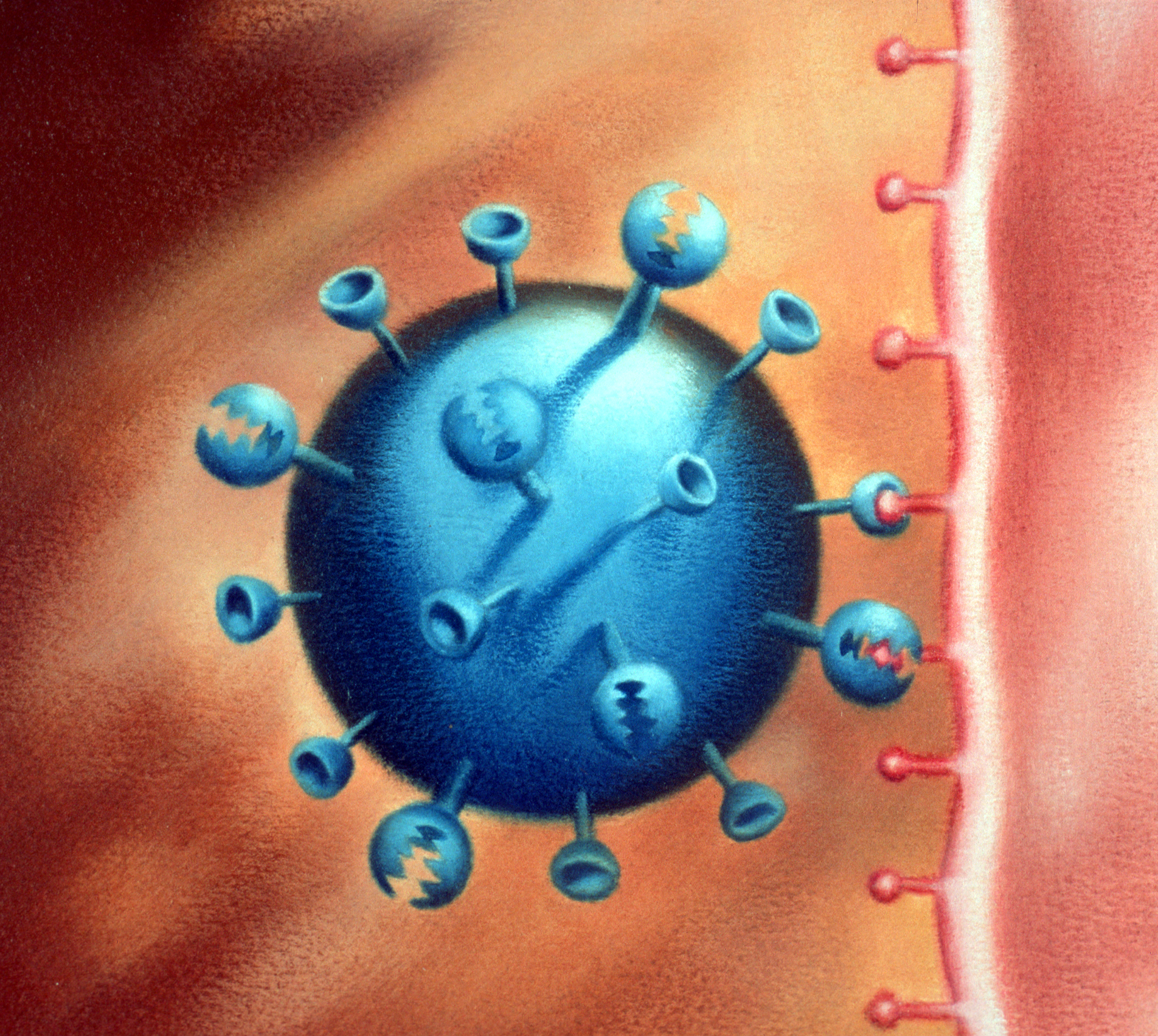
Illustration showing influenza virus attaching to cell membrane via the surface protein hemagglutinin

The term hemagglutinin (alternatively spelt haemagglutinin, from the Greek haima, 'blood' + Latin gluten, 'glue') refers to any protein that can cause red blood cells (erythrocytes) to clump together ("agglutinate") in vitro. They do this by binding to the sugar residues on a red blood cell; when a single hemagglutinin molecule binds sugars from multiple red blood cells, it "glues" these cells together. As a result, they are carbohydrate-binding proteins (lectins). The ability to bind red blood cell sugars have independently appeared several times, and as a result hemagglutinins do not all bind using the same mechanism. The ability to bind red blood sugars is also not necessarily related to the in vivo function of the protein.

The term hemagglutinin is most commonly applied to plant and viral lectins. Natural proteins that clump together red blood cells were known since the turn of the 19th century. Virologist George K. Hirst is also credited for "discovering agglutination and hemagglutinin" in 1941. Alfred Gottschalk proved in 1957 that hemagglutinins bind a virus to a host cell by attaching to sialic acids on carbohydrate side chains of cell-membrane glycoproteins and glycolipids.

== Viruses ==
In the viral families Paramyxoviridae and Orthomyxoviridae, viruses use a homotrimeric glycoprotein hemagglutinin on their protein capsids. Hemagglutinins are responsible for binding to receptors, sialic acid residues, on host cell membranes to initiate virus docking and infection.

Specifically, they recognize cell-surface glycoconjugates containing sialic acid on the surface of host red blood cells with a low affinity and use them to enter the endosome of host cells. Hemagglutinins tend to recognize α-2,6-linked sialic acids of the host cells in humans and α-2,3-linked sialic acids in avian species, although there is evidence that hemagglutinin specificity can vary. This correlates to the fact that Influenza A typically establishes infections in the upper respiratory tract in humans, where many of these α-2,6-linked sialic acids are present. There are various subtypes of hemagglutinins, in which H1, H2, and H3 are known to have human susceptibility. It is the variation in hemagglutinin (and neuraminidase) subtypes that require health organizations (ex. WHO) to constantly update and surveil the known circulating flu viruses in human and animal populations (ex. H5N1).

In the endosome, hemagglutinins undergo conformational changes due to a pH drop to of 5–6.5 enabling viral attachment through a fusion peptide.

=== Types ===
- Influenza hemagglutinin: a homotrimeric glycoprotein that is found on the surface of influenza viruses which is responsible for their infectivity. Influenza strains are named for the specific hemagglutinin variant they produce, along with the specific variant of another surface protein, neuraminidase.
  - These hemagglutinins are subject to rapid evolution via antigenic shift and drift in the influenza avian reservoir. This results in new subtype of hemagglutinins being created frequently, and is the cause of seasonal influenza outbreaks in humans.
- Measles hemagglutinin: a hemagglutinin produced by the measles virus that encodes six structural proteins, with hemagglutinin and fusion proteins being surface glycoproteins involved in attachment and entry.
- Parainfluenza hemagglutinin-neuraminidase: a type of hemagglutinin-neuraminidase produced by parainfluenza, which is closely associated with both human and veterinary disease.
- Mumps hemagglutinin-neuraminidase: a kind of hemagglutinin that the mumps virus (MuV) produces.

=== Structure ===
Hemagglutinins are small proteins that extend from the surface of the virus membrane as spikes that are 135 Angstroms (Å) in length and 30-50 Å in diameter. Each spike is composed of three identical monomer subunits, making the protein a homotrimer. These monomers are formed of two glycopeptides, HA1 and HA2, and linked by two disulphide polypeptides, including membrane-distal HA1 and the smaller membrane-proximal HA2. X-ray crystallography, NMR spectroscopy, and cryo-electron microscopy were used to solve the protein's structure, the majority of which is α-helical. In addition to the homotrimeric core structure, hemagglutinins have four subdomains: the membrane-distal receptor binding R subdomain, the vestigial domain E, that functions as a receptor-destroying esterase, the fusion domain F, and the membrane anchor subdomain M. The membrane anchor subdomain forms elastic protein chains linking the hemagglutinin to the ectodomain.

=== Mechanism ===
On the viral capsids of influenza types A and B, hemagglutinin is initially inactive. Only when cleaved by host proteins, does each monomer polypeptide of the homotrimer transforms into a dimer – composed of HA1 and HA2 subunits attached by disulfide bridges. The HA1 subunit is responsible for docking the viral capsid onto the host cell by binding to sialic acid residues present on the surface of host respiratory cells. This binding triggers endocytosis. The pH in the endosomal compartment then decreases from proton influx, and this causes a conformational change in HA that forces the HA2 subunit to "flip outward." The HA2 subunit is responsible for membrane fusion. It binds to the endosomal membrane, pulling the viral capsid membrane and the endosomal membrane tightly together, eventually forming a pore through which the viral genome can enter into the host cell cytoplasm. From here, the virus can use host machinery to proliferate.

== Plants ==
See phytohaemagglutinin.

== Uses in serology ==
- Hemagglutination Inhibition Assay: A serologic assay which can be used either to screen for antibodies using RBCs with known surface antigens, or to identify RBCs surface antigens such as viruses or bacteria using a panel of known antibodies. This method, performed first by George K. Hirst in 1942, consists of mixing virus samples with serum dilutions so that antibodies bind to the virus before RBCs are added to the mix. Consequently, those viruses bound to antibodies are unable to link RBCs, meaning that a test's positive result due to hemagglutination has been inhibited. On the contrary, if hemagglutination occurs, the test will result negative.
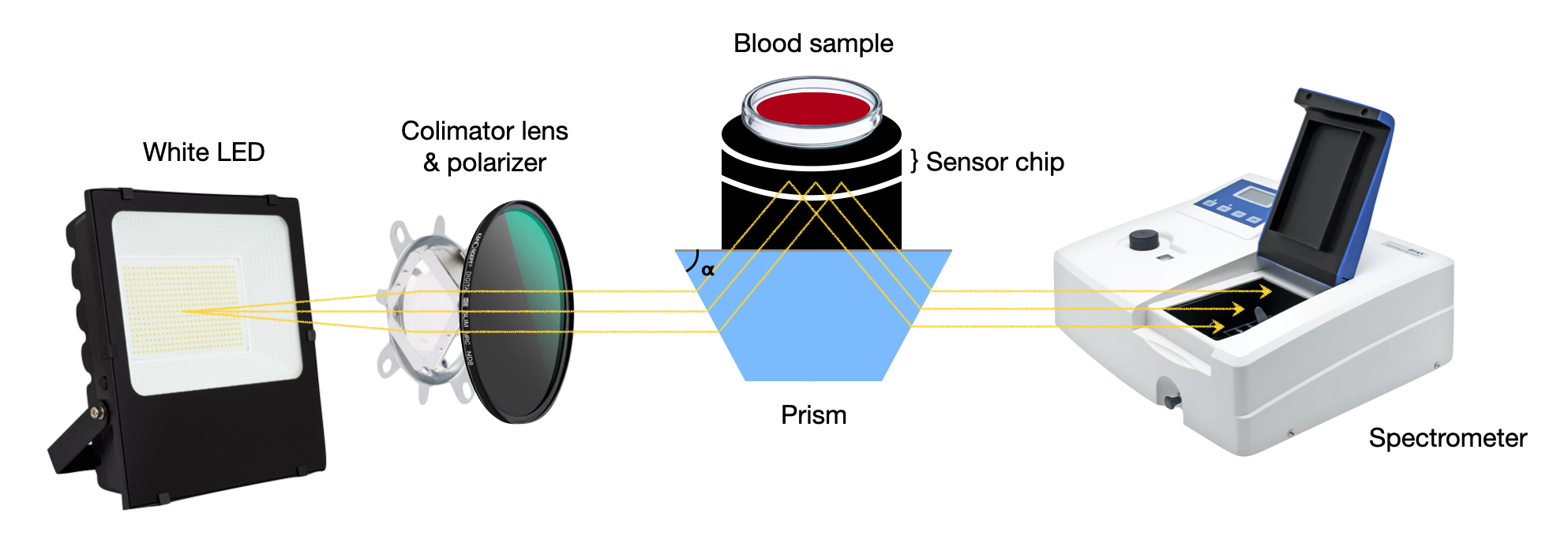
  A schematic diagram of the experimental setup to detect hemagglutination for blood typing.
- Hemagglutination blood typing detection: This method consists of measuring the blood's reflectance spectrum alone (non-agglutination), and that of blood mixed with antibody reagents (agglutination) using a waveguide-mode sensor. As a result, some differences in reflectance between the samples are observed. Once antibodies are added, blood types and Rh(D) typing can be determined using the waveguide-mode sensor. This technique is able to detect weak agglutinations that are almost impossible to detect with the human eye.
- ABO blood group determination: Using anti-A and anti-B antibodies that bind specifically to either the A or to the B blood group surface antigens on RBCs, it is possible to test a small sample of blood and determine the ABO blood type of an individual. It does not identify the Rh(D) antigen (Rh blood type).
- The bedside card method of blood grouping relies on visual agglutination to determine an individual's blood group. The card contains dried blood group antibody reagents fixed onto its surface. A drop of the individual's blood is placed on each blood group area on the card. The presence or absence of flocculation (visual agglutination) enables a quick and convenient method of determining the ABO and Rhesus status of the individual. As this technique depends on human eyes, it is less reliable than the blood typing based on waveguide-mode sensors.
- The agglutination of red blood cells is used in the Coombs test in diagnostic immunohematology to test for autoimmune hemolytic anemia.
- In the case of red blood cells, transformed cells are known as kodecytes. Kode technology exposes exogenous antigens on the surface of cells, allowing antibody-antigen responses to be detected by the traditional hemagglutination test.

== See also ==
- Cold agglutinin disease
- Hemagglutination assay
- Neuraminidase
- Influenza hemagglutinin (HA)
- Agglutination
