= Measles (disambiguation) =

Measles is an infectious disease.

Measles may also refer to:

- Measles vaccine, a vaccine against measles
- Measles virus (measles morbillivirus), a non-segmented RNA virus
- Measles virus encoding the human thyroidal sodium iodide symporter, an attenuated strain
- Measles hemagglutinin, a hemagglutinin produced by measles
- Maryann Measles, a 13-year-old murder victim from New Milford, Connecticut

== See also ==
- Rocky Mountain spotted fever (also known as "black measles")
- Roseola (also known as "baby measles")
- Rubella (also known as "German measles" or "three-day measles")
- MMR vaccine: MMR = measles, mumps, rubella.
- Measles: A Dangerous Illness by Roald Dahl.
