= Mumps =

Human disease caused by paramyxovirus

- Other names: Epidemic parotitis
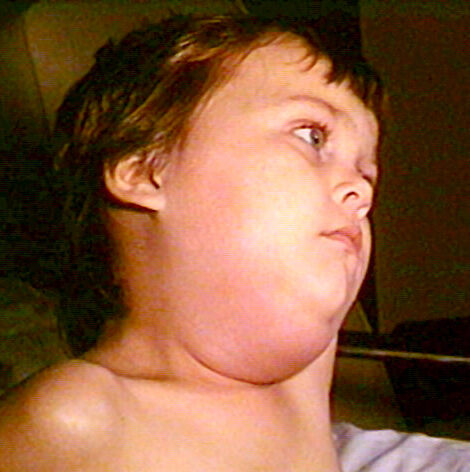
- Child with mumps showing characteristic facial swelling
- Specialty: Infectious disease
- Symptoms: Parotitis and non-specific symptoms such as fever, headache, malaise, muscle pain, and loss of appetite
- Complications: Deafness, inflammatory conditions such as orchitis, oophoritis, pancreatitis, encephalitis, and rarely, sterility
- Usual onset: 7–25 days after exposure
- Duration: Usually less than two weeks
- Causes: Mumps virus
- Risk factors: Exposure to someone with mumps
- Diagnostic method: Antibody testing, viral cultures, and reverse transcription polymerase chain reaction
- Prevention: Mumps vaccine
- Treatment: Supportive
- Medication: Pain medication, intravenous immunoglobulin
- Prognosis: Usually excellent; case fatality rate of 1.6–3.8 people per 10,000 pre vaccination (US, 1966–1975)
- Frequency: 385,000+ (387,529 reported) (2023)

Mumps is a highly contagious, vaccine-preventable viral disease caused by the mumps virus. Initial symptoms of mumps are non-specific and include fever, headache, malaise, muscle pain, and loss of appetite. These symptoms are usually followed by painful swelling around the side of the face (the parotid glands, called parotitis), which is the most common symptom of a mumps infection. Symptoms typically occur 16 to 18 days after exposure to the virus. About one-third of people with a mumps infection do not have any symptoms (asymptomatic).

Complications are rare but include deafness and a wide range of inflammatory conditions, of which inflammation of the testes, breasts, ovaries, pancreas, meninges, and brain are the most common. Testicular inflammation may result in reduced fertility and, rarely, sterility.

Humans are the only natural hosts of the mumps virus. The mumps virus is an RNA virus in the family Paramyxoviridae. The virus is primarily transmitted by respiratory secretions such as droplets and saliva, as well as via direct contact with an infected person. Mumps is highly contagious and spreads easily in densely populated environments. Transmission can occur from one week before the onset of symptoms to eight days after. During infection, the virus first infects the upper respiratory tract. From there, it spreads to the salivary glands and lymph nodes. Infection of the lymph nodes leads to the presence of the virus in the blood, which spreads the virus throughout the body. In places where mumps is common, it can be diagnosed based on clinical presentation. In places where mumps is less common, however, laboratory diagnosis using antibody testing, viral cultures, or real-time reverse transcription polymerase chain reaction may be needed.

There is no specific treatment for mumps, so treatment is supportive and includes rest and pain relief. Mumps infection is usually self-limiting, coming to an end as the immune system clears the infection. Infection can be prevented with vaccination. The MMR vaccine is a safe and effective vaccine to prevent mumps infections and is used widely around the world. The MMR vaccine also protects against measles and rubella. The spread of the disease can also be prevented by isolating infected individuals.

Mumps historically has been a highly prevalent disease, commonly occurring in outbreaks in densely crowded spaces. In the absence of vaccination, infection normally occurs in childhood, most frequently at the ages of 5–9. Symptoms and complications are more common in males and more severe in adolescents and adults. Infection is most common in winter and spring in temperate climates, whereas no seasonality is observed in tropical regions. Written accounts of mumps have existed since ancient times, and the cause of mumps, the mumps virus, was discovered in 1934. By the 1970s, vaccines had been created to protect against infection, and countries that have adopted mumps vaccination have seen a near-elimination of the disease. In the 21st century, however, there has been a resurgence in the number of cases in many countries that vaccinate, primarily among adolescents and young adults, due to multiple factors such as waning vaccine immunity and opposition to vaccination.

== Etymology ==
The word "mumps" was first attested circa 1600 and is the plural form of "mump", meaning "grimace", originally a verb meaning "to whine or mutter like a beggar". The disease was likely called mumps due to the swelling caused by mumps parotitis, reflecting its impact on facial expressions and the painful, difficult swallowing that it causes. "Mumps" was also used starting from the 17th century to mean "a fit of melancholy, sullenness, silent displeasure". Mumps is sometimes called "epidemic parotitis".

== History ==
According to Chinese medical literature, mumps was recorded as far back as 640 B.C. The Greek physician Hippocrates documented an outbreak on the island of Thasos in approximately 410 B.C. and provided a fuller description of the disease in the first book of Epidemics in the Corpus Hippocraticum. In modern times, the disease was first described scientifically in 1790 by British physician Robert Hamilton in Transactions of the Royal Society of Edinburgh. During the First World War, mumps was one of the most debilitating diseases among soldiers. In 1934, the etiology of the disease, the mumps virus, was discovered by Claude D. Johnson and Ernest William Goodpasture. They found that rhesus macaques exposed to saliva taken from humans in the early stages of the disease developed mumps. Furthermore, they showed that mumps could then be transferred to children via filtered and sterilized, bacteria-less preparations of macerated monkey parotid tissue, showing that it was a viral disease.

In 1945, the mumps virus was isolated for the first time. Just a few years later, in 1948, an inactivated vaccine using killed viruses was invented. This vaccine provided only short-term immunity and was later discontinued. It was replaced in the 1970s with vaccines that have live but weakened viruses, which are more effective at providing long-term immunity than the inactivated vaccine. The first of these vaccines was Mumpsvax, licensed on 30 March 1967, which used the Jeryl Lynn strain. Maurice Hilleman created this vaccine using the strain taken from his five-year-old daughter, Jeryl Lynn. Mumpsvax was recommended for use in 1977, and the Jeryl Lynn strain continues to be used.

Hilleman worked to combine the attenuated mumps vaccines with the measles and rubella vaccines, creating the MMR-1 vaccine. In 1971, a newer version, MMR-2, was approved for use by the US Food and Drug Administration. In the 1980s, the benefit of multiple doses was recognized, so a two-dose immunization schedule was widely adopted. With MMR-2, four other MMR vaccines have been created since the 1960s: Triviraten, Morupar, Priorix, and Trimovax. Since the mid-2000s, two MMRV vaccines have been in use: Priorix-Tetra and ProQuad.

The United States began to vaccinate against mumps in the 1960s, with other countries following suit. From 1977 to 1985, 290 cases per 100,000 people were diagnosed each year worldwide. Although few countries recorded mumps cases after they began vaccination, those that did reported dramatic declines. From 1968 to 1982, cases declined by 97% in the U.S., and in Finland cases were reduced to less than one per 100,000 people per year, and a decline from 160 cases per 100,000 to 17 per 100,000 per year in England was observed from 1989 to 1995. By 2001, there had been a 99.9% reduction in the number of cases in the U.S. and similar near-elimination in other vaccinating countries.

In Japan in 1993, concerns over the rates of aseptic meningitis following MMR vaccination with the Urabe strain prompted the removal of MMR vaccines from the national immunization program, resulting in a dramatic increase in the number of cases. Japan provides voluntary mumps vaccination separately from measles and rubella. Starting in the mid-1990s, controversies surrounding the MMR vaccine emerged. One paper connected the MMR vaccine to Crohn's disease in 1995, and another in 1998 connected it to autism spectrum disorders and inflammatory bowel disease. These papers are now considered to be fraudulent and incorrect, and no association between the MMR vaccine and the aforementioned conditions has been identified. Despite this, their publication led to a significant decline in vaccination rates, ultimately causing measles, mumps, and rubella to reemerge in places with lowered vaccination rates.

Outbreaks in the 21st century include more than 300,000 cases in China in 2013 and more than 56,000 cases in England and Wales in 2004–2005. In the latter outbreak, most cases were reported in 15–24 year olds who were attending colleges and universities. This age group was thought to be vulnerable to infection because of the MMR vaccine controversies when they should have been vaccinated or MMR vaccine shortages that had also occurred at that time. Similar outbreaks in densely crowded environments have frequently occurred in many other countries, including the U.S., the Netherlands, Sweden, and Belgium.

=== Resurgence ===
Select mumps outbreaks exceeding 1,000 cases in vaccinating locations
Year(s)	Location	Number of cases
2005–2006	Czech Republic	5,998
2006	U.S.	6,584
2009	New York (U.S.)	1,521
2009–2011	Jerusalem	3,130
2012–2013	Belgium	4,061
2013	Poland	2,436
2014	U.S.	1,151
2016–2017	Arkansas (U.S.)	2,706
2017	U.S.	5,629

In the 21st century, mumps has reemerged in many places that vaccinate against it, causing recurrent outbreaks. These outbreaks have largely affected adolescents and young adults in densely crowded spaces, such as schools, sports teams, religious gatherings, and the military, and it is expected that outbreaks will continue to occur. The cause of this reemergence is subject to debate, and various factors have been proposed, including waning immunity from vaccination, low vaccination rates, vaccine failure, and potential antigenic variation of the mumps virus.

Waning immunity from vaccines is likely the primary cause of the mumps resurgence. In the past, subclinical natural infections provided boosts to immunity similar to vaccines. As time went on with vaccine use, these asymptomatic infections declined in frequency, likely leading to a reduction in long-term immunity against mumps. With less long-term immunity, the effects of waning vaccine immunity became more prominent, and vaccinated individuals have frequently fallen ill from mumps. A third dose of the vaccine provided in adolescence has been considered to address this as some studies support this. Other research indicates that a third dose may be useful only for short-term immunity in responding to outbreaks, which is recommended for at-risk persons by the Advisory Committee on Immunization Practices of the Centers for Disease Control and Prevention.

Low vaccination rates have been implicated as the cause of some outbreaks in the UK, Canada, Sweden, and Japan, whereas outbreaks in other places, such as the U.S., the Czech Republic, and the Netherlands, have occurred mainly among the vaccinated. Compared to the measles and rubella vaccines, mumps vaccines appear to have a relatively high failure rate, varying depending on the vaccine strain. This has been addressed by providing two vaccine doses, supported by recent outbreaks among the vaccinated having primarily occurred among those who received only one dose. Lastly, certain mumps virus lineages are highly divergent genetically from vaccine strains, which may cause a mismatch between protection against vaccine strains and non-vaccine strains, though research is inconclusive on this matter.

== Signs and symptoms ==
=== Common symptoms ===
The incubation period, the time between the start of an infection and when symptoms begin to show, is about 7–25 days, averaging 16–18 days. 20–40% of infections are asymptomatic or are restricted to mild respiratory symptoms, sometimes with a fever. Over the course of the disease, three distinct phases are recognized: prodromal, early acute, and established acute. The prodromal phase typically has non-specific, mild symptoms such as a low-grade fever, headache, malaise, muscle pain, loss of appetite, and sore throat. In the early acute phase, as the mumps virus spreads throughout the body, systemic symptoms emerge. Most commonly, parotitis occurs during this time period. During the established acute phase, orchitis, meningitis, and encephalitis may occur, and these conditions are responsible for the bulk of mumps morbidity.

The parotid glands are salivary glands situated on the sides of the mouth in front of the ears. Inflammation of them, called parotitis, is the most common mumps symptom and occurs in about 90% of symptomatic cases and 60–70% of total infections. During mumps parotitis, usually both the left and right parotid glands experience painful swelling, with unilateral swelling in a small percentage of cases. Parotitis occurs 2–3 weeks after exposure to the virus, within two days of developing symptoms, and usually lasts 2–3 days, but it may last as long as a week or longer.

In 90% of parotitis cases, swelling on one side is delayed rather than both sides swelling in unison. The parotid duct, which is the opening that provides saliva from the parotid glands to the mouth, may become red, swollen, and filled with fluid. Parotitis is usually preceded by local tenderness and occasionally earache. Other salivary glands, namely the submandibular, and sublingual glands, may also swell. Inflammation of these glands is rarely the only symptom.

=== Complications ===
Outside of the salivary glands, inflammation of the testes, called orchitis, is the most common symptom of infection. Pain, swelling, and warmness of a testis appear usually 1–2 weeks after the onset of parotitis but can occur up to six weeks later. During mumps orchitis, the scrotum is tender and inflamed. It occurs in 10–40% of pubertal and post-pubertal males who contract mumps. Usually, mumps orchitis affects only one testis but in 10–30% of cases both are affected. Mumps orchitis is accompanied by inflammation of the epididymis, called epididymitis, about 85% of the time, typically occurring before orchitis. The onset of mumps orchitis is associated with a high-grade fever, vomiting, headache, and malaise. In prepubertal males, orchitis is rare as symptoms are usually restricted to parotitis.

A variety of other inflammatory conditions may also occur as a result of mumps virus infection, including:

- Mastitis, inflammation of the breasts, in up to about 30% of post-pubertal women
- Oophoritis, inflammation of an ovary, in 5–10% of post-pubertal women, which usually presents as pelvic pain
- Aseptic meningitis, inflammation of the meninges, in 5–10% of cases and 4–6% of those with parotitis, typically occurring 4–10 days after the onset of symptoms. Mumps meningitis can also occur up to one week before parotitis as well as in the absence of parotitis. It is commonly accompanied by fever, headache, vomiting, and neck stiffness.
- Pancreatitis, inflammation of the pancreas, in about 4% of cases, which causes severe pain and tenderness in the upper abdomen below the ribs
- Encephalitis, inflammation of the brain, in less than 0.5% of cases. People who experience mumps encephalitis typically experience a fever, altered consciousness, seizures, and weakness. Like meningitis, mumps encephalitis can occur in the absence of parotitis.
- Meningoencephalitis, inflammation of the brain and its surrounding membranes. Mumps meningoencephalitis is commonly accompanied by fever 97% of the time, vomiting 94% of the time, and headache 88.8% of the time.
- Nephritis, inflammation of the kidneys, which is rare because kidney involvement in mumps is usually benign but leads to presence of the virus in urine
- Inflammation of the joints (arthritis), which may affect at least five joints (polyarthritis), multiple nerves in the peripheral nervous system (polyneuritis), pneumonia, gallbladder without gallstones (acalculous cholecystitis), cornea and uveal tract (keratouveitis), thyroids (thyroiditis), liver (hepatitis), retina (retinitis), and corneal endothelium (corneal endothelitis), all of which are rare
- Recurrent sialadenitis, inflammation of the salivary glands, which is frequent

A relatively common complication is deafness, which occurs in about 4% of cases. Mumps deafness is often accompanied by vestibular symptoms such as vertigo and repetitive, uncontrolled eye movements. Based on electrocardiographic abnormalities in the infected, MuV also likely infects cardiac tissue, but this is usually asymptomatic. Rarely, myocarditis and pericarditis can occur. Fluid buildup in the brain, called hydrocephalus, has also been observed. In the first trimester of pregnancy, mumps may increase the risk of miscarriage. Otherwise, mumps is not associated with birth defects.

Other rare complications of infection include: paralysis, seizures, cranial nerve palsies, cerebellar ataxia, transverse myelitis, ascending polyradiculitis, a polio-like disease, arthropathy, autoimmune hemolytic anemia, idiopathic thrombocytopenic purpura, Guillain–Barré syndrome, post-infectious encephalitis encephalomyelitis, and hemophagocytic syndrome. At least one complication occurs in combination with the standard mumps symptoms in up to 42% of cases. Mumps has also been connected to the onset of type 1 diabetes, and, relatedly, the mumps virus is able to infect and replicate in insulin-producing beta cells. Among children, seizures occur in about 20–30% of cases involving the central nervous system.

== Cause ==
Mumps is caused by the mumps virus (MuV), scientific name Mumps orthorubulavirus, which belongs to the Orthorubulavirus genus in the Paramyxoviridae family of viruses. Humans are the only natural host of the mumps virus. MuV's genome is made of RNA and contains seven genes that encode nine proteins. In MuV particles, the genome is encased by a helical capsid. The capsid is surrounded by a viral envelope that has spikes protruding from its surface. MuV particles are pleomorphic in shape and range from 100 to 600 nanometers in diameter.

The replication cycle of MuV begins when the spikes on its surface bond to a cell, which then causes the envelope to fuse with the host cell's cell membrane, releasing the capsid into the host cell's cytoplasm. Upon entry, the viral RNA-dependent RNA polymerase (RdRp) transcribes messenger RNA (mRNA) from the genome, which is then translated by the host cell's ribosomes to synthesize viral proteins. RdRp then begins replicating the viral genome to produce progeny. Viral spike proteins fuse into the host cell's membrane, and new virions are formed at the sites beneath the spikes. MuV then utilizes host cell proteins to leave the host cell by budding from its surface, using the host cell's membrane as the viral envelope.

Twelve genotypes of MuV are recognized, named genotypes A to N, excluding E and M. These genotypes vary in frequency from region to region. For example, genotypes C, D, H, and J are more common in the western hemisphere, whereas genotypes F, G, and I are more common in Asia, although genotype G is considered to be a global genotype. Genotypes A and B have not been observed in the wild since the 1990s. MuV has just one serotype, so antibodies to one genotype are functional against all genotypes. MuV is a relatively stable virus and is unlikely to experience antigenic shifting that may cause new strains to emerge.

== Transmission ==
The mumps virus is mainly transmitted by inhalation or oral contact with respiratory droplets or secretions. In experiments, mumps could develop after inoculation either via the mouth or the nose. Respiratory transmission is also supported by the presence of MuV in cases of respiratory illness without parotitis, detection in nasal samples, and transmission between people in close contact. MuV is excreted in saliva from approximately one week before to eight days after the onset of symptoms, peaking at the onset of parotitis, though it has also been identified in the saliva of asymptomatic individuals.

Mother-to-child transmission has been observed in various forms. In non-human primates, placental transmission has been observed, which is supported by the isolation of MuV from spontaneous and planned aborted fetuses during maternal mumps. MuV has also been isolated from newborns whose mother was infected. While MuV has been detected in breast milk, it is unclear if the virus can be transmitted through it. Other manners of transmission include direct contact with infected droplets or saliva, fomites contaminated by saliva and possibly urine. Most transmissions likely occur before the development of symptoms and up to five days after such time.

In susceptible populations, a single case can cause up to twelve new ones. The period when a person is contagious lasts from two days before the onset of symptoms to nine days after symptoms have ceased. Asymptomatic carriers of the mump virus can also transmit the virus. These factors are thought to be reasons why controlling the spread of mumps is difficult. Furthermore, reinfection can occur after natural infection or vaccination, indicating that lifelong immunity is not guaranteed after infection. Vaccinated individuals who are infected appear to be less contagious than the unvaccinated.

The average number of new cases generated from a single case in a susceptible population called the basic reproduction number, is 4–7. Given this, it is estimated that a vaccination rate between 79 and 100% is needed to achieve herd immunity. Outbreaks continue to occur in places that have vaccination rates exceeding 90%, however, suggesting that other factors may influence disease transmission. Outbreaks that have occurred in these vaccinated communities typically occur in highly crowded areas such as schools and military dormitories.

== Pathogenesis ==
Many aspects of the pathogenesis of mumps are poorly understood and are inferred from clinical observations and experimental infections in laboratory animals. These animal studies may be unreliable due to unnatural methods of inoculation. Following exposure, the virus infects epithelial cells in the upper respiratory tract that express sialic acid receptors on their surface. After infection, the virus spreads to the parotid glands, causing the signature parotitis. It is thought that shortly after infection the virus spreads to lymph nodes, in particular T-cells and viruses in the blood, called viremia. Viremia lasts for 7–10 days, during which MuV spreads throughout the body.

In mumps orchitis, infection leads to: parenchymal edema; congestion, or separation, of the seminiferous tubules; and perivascular infiltration by lymphocytes. The tunica albuginea forms a barrier against edema, causing an increase in intratesticular pressure that causes necrosis of the seminiferous tubules. The seminiferous tubules also experience hyalinization, i.e. degeneration into a translucent glass-like substance, which can cause fibrosis and atrophy of the testes.

In up to half of cases, MuV infiltrates the central nervous system (CNS), where it may cause meningitis, encephalitis, or hydrocephalus. Mumps is rarely fatal, so few post-mortem analyses have been done to analyze CNS involvement. Of these, fluid buildup, congestion, and hemorrhaging in the brain, white blood cell infiltration in the perivascular spaces in the brain, reactive changes to glial cells and damage to the myelin sheaths surrounding neurons were observed. Neurons appear to be relatively unaffected.

In laboratory tests on rodents, MuV appears to enter the CNS first through cerebrospinal fluid (CSF), then spreading to the ventricular system. There, MuV replicates in ependymal cells that line the ventricles, which allows the virus to enter the brain parenchyma. This often leads to MuV infecting pyramidal cells in the cerebral cortex and hippocampus. Infected ependymal cells become inflamed, lose their cilia, and collapse into CSF, which may be the cause of the narrowing of the cerebral aqueduct thought to cause mumps hydrocephalus.

In humans, mumps hydrocephalus may be due to obstruction of the cerebral aqueduct with dilatation of the lateral and third ventricles, obstruction of the interventricular foramina, or obstruction of the median and lateral apertures. Ependymal cells have been isolated from CSF of mumps patients, suggesting that animals and humans share hydrocephalus pathogenesis. Hydrocephalus has also been observed in the absence of canal obstruction, however, indicating that obstruction may be a result of external compression by edematous tissue and not related to hydrocephalus.

Deafness from mumps may be caused by MuV infection in CSF, which has contact with the perilymph of the inner ear, possibly leading to infection of the cochlea, or it may occur as a result of inner ear infection via viremia that leads to inflammation in the endolymph. Hearing loss may also be caused indirectly by the immune response. In animal studies, MuV has been isolated from the vestibular ganglion, which may explain vestibular symptoms such as vertigo that often co-occur with deafness.

== Immune response ==
Even though MuV has just one serotype, significant variation in the quantity of genotype-specific sera needed to neutralize different genotypes in vitro has been observed. Neutralizing antibodies in the salivary glands may be important in restricting MuV replication and transmission via saliva, as the level of viral secretion in saliva inversely correlates to the quantity of MuV-specific IgA produced. The neutralizing ability of salivary IgA appears to be greater than serum IgG and IgM.

It has been proposed that symptomatic infections in the vaccinated may be because memory T lymphocytes generated as a result of vaccination may be necessary but insufficient for protection. The immune system in general appears to have a relatively weak response to the mumps virus, indicated by various measures: antibody production appears to be predominately directed toward non-neutralizing viral proteins, and there may be a low quantity of MuV-specific memory B lymphocytes. The amount of antibodies needed to confer immunity is unknown.

== Diagnosis ==
In places where mumps is widespread, diagnosis can be made based on the development of parotitis and a history of exposure to someone with mumps. In places where mumps is less common because parotitis has other causes, laboratory diagnosis may be needed to verify mumps infection. A differential diagnosis may be used to compare symptoms to other diseases, including allergic reaction, mastoiditis, measles, and pediatric HIV infection and rubella. MuV can be isolated from saliva, blood, the nasopharynx, salivary ducts, and seminal fluid within one week of the onset of symptoms, as well as from cell cultures. In meningitis cases, MuV can be isolated from CSF. In CNS cases, a lumbar puncture may be used to rule out other potential causes, which shows normal opening pressure, more than ten leukocytes per cubic millimeter, elevated lymphocyte count in CSF, polymorphonuclear leukocytes up to 25% of the time, often a mildly elevated protein level, and a slightly reduced CSF glucose to blood glucose ratio up to 30% of the time.

Mumps-specific IgM antibodies in serum or oral fluid specimens can be used to identify mumps. IgM quantities peak up to eight days after the onset of symptoms, and IgM can be measured by enzyme-linked immunosorbent assays (ELISA) 7–10 days after the onset of symptoms. Sensitivity to IgM testing is variable, ranging from as low as 24–51% to 75% in the first week and 100% thereafter. Throughout infection, IgM titers increase four-fold between the acute phase and recovery. False negatives can occur in people previously infected or vaccinated, in which case a rise of serum IgG may be more useful for diagnosis. False positives can occur after infection of parainfluenza viruses 1 and 3 and Newcastle disease virus as well as recently after mumps vaccination.

Antibody titers can also be measured with complement fixation tests, hemagglutination assays, and neutralization tests. In vaccinated people, antibody-based diagnosis can be difficult since IgM oftentimes cannot be detected in acute-phase serum samples. In these instances, it is easier to identify MuV RNA from oral fluid, a throat swab, or urine. In meningitis cases, MuV-specific IgM can be found in CSF in half of cases, and IgG in 30–90%, sometimes lasting for more than a year with increased white blood cell count. These findings are not associated with an increased risk of long-term complications. Most parotitis cases have elevated white blood cell count in CSF.

Real-time reverse transcription polymerase chain reaction (rRT-PCR) can be used to detect MuV RNA from the first day symptoms appear, declining over the next 8–10 days. rRT-PCR of saliva is typically positive from 2–3 days before parotitis develops to 4–5 days after and has a sensitivity of about 70%. Since MuV replicates in kidneys, viral culture and RNA detection in urine can be used for diagnosis up to two weeks after symptoms begin, though rRT-PCR used to identify the virus in urine has a very low sensitivity compared to virus cultures at below 30%. In meningoencephalitis cases, a nested RT-PCR can detect MuV RNA in CSF up to two years after infection.

In sialadenitis cases, imaging shows an enlargement of the salivary glands, fat stranding, and thickening of the superficial cervical fascia and platysma muscles, which are situated on the front side of the neck. If parotitis occurs only on one side, then detection of mumps-specific IgM antibodies, IgG titer, or PCR is required for diagnosis. In cases of pancreatitis, there may be elevated levels of lipase or amylase, an enzyme found in saliva and the pancreas.

Mumps orchitis is usually diagnosed by white blood cell count, with normal differential white blood cell counts. A complete blood count can show above or below-average white blood cell count and an elevated C-reactive protein level. Urine analysis can exclude bacterial infections. If orchitis is present with normal urine analysis, negative urethral cultures, and negative midstream urine, then that can indicate mumps orchitis. Ultrasounds typically show diffuse hyper-vascularity, increased volume of the testes and epididymis, lower than usual ability to return ultrasound signals, swelling of the epididymis, and formation of hydroceles. Echo color Doppler ultrasound is more effective at detecting orchitis than ultrasound alone.

== Prevention ==
Select mumps combination vaccines
Vaccine	Strain	MMR(V)
MMR II	Jeryl Lynn	MMR
Morupar	Urabe AM9	MMR
Priorix	Jeryl Lynn RIT 4385	MMR
Trimovax	Urabe AM9	MMR
Triviraten	Rubini	MMR
Priorix-Tetra	Jeryl Lynn RIT 4385	MMRV
ProQuad	Jeryl Lynn	MMRV

Mumps is preventable with vaccination. Mumps vaccines use live attenuated viruses. Most countries include mumps vaccination in their immunization programs, and the MMR vaccine, which also protects against measles and rubella, is the most commonly used mumps vaccine. Mumps vaccination can also be done on its own and as a part of the MMRV vaccine, which also protects against measles, rubella, chickenpox, and shingles. More than 120 countries have adopted mumps vaccination, but coverage remains low in most African, South Asian, and Southeast Asian countries. In countries that have implemented mumps vaccination, significant declines in mumps cases and complications caused by infection such as encephalitis have been observed. Mumps vaccines are typically administered in early childhood, but may also be given in adolescence and adulthood if need be. Vaccination is expected to be capable of neutralizing wild-type MuVs, which are not included in the vaccine, since they do not appear to evade vaccine-derived immunity.

A variety of virus strains have been used in mumps vaccines, including the Jeryl Lynn (JL), Leningrad-3, Leningrad-3-Zagreb (L-Zagreb), Rubini, and Urabe AM9 strains. Some other less prominent strains exist that are typically confined to individual countries. These include the Hoshino, Miyahara, Torii, and NK M-46 strains that have been produced in Japan and the S-12 strain, which is used by Iran. Mild adverse reactions are relatively common, including fever and rash, but aseptic meningitis also occurs at varying rates. Other rare adverse reactions include meningoencephalitis, parotitis, deafness from inner ear damage, orchitis, and pancreatitis. Safety and effectiveness vary by vaccine strain:

- Rubini is safe but because of its low effectiveness in outbreaks, its use has been abandoned.
- JL is relatively safe and has a relatively high effectiveness. However, the effectiveness is significantly lower in outbreaks. A modified version of JL vaccines is RIT 4385, which is also considered safe.
- Urabe and Leningrad-3 are both at least as effective as JL, but are less safe.
- L-Zagreb, a modified version of Leningrad-3, is considered safe and effective, including in outbreaks.

Mumps protection from the MMR vaccine is higher after two doses than one and is estimated to be between 79% and 95%, lower than the degree of protection against measles and rubella. This, however, has still been sufficient to nearly eliminate mumps in countries that vaccinate against it as well as significantly reduce frequencies of complications among the vaccinated. If at least one dose is received, then hospitalization rates are reduced by an estimated 50% among the infected. Compared to the MMR vaccine, the MMRV vaccine appears to be less effective in terms of providing mumps protection. A difficulty in assessing vaccine effectiveness is that there is no clear correlate of immunity, so it is not possible to predict if a person has acquired immunity from the vaccine.

There is a lack of data on the effectiveness of a third dose of the MMR vaccine. In an outbreak in which a third dose was administered, it was unclear if it had any effect on reducing disease incidence, and it only appeared to boost antibodies in those who previously had little or no antibodies to mumps. Contraindications for mumps vaccines include prior allergic reaction to any ingredients or to neomycin, pregnancy, immunosuppression, a moderate or severe illness, having received a blood product recently, and, for MMRV vaccines specifically, a personal or familial history of seizures. It is also advised that women not become pregnant in the four weeks after MMR vaccination. No effective prophylaxis exists for mumps after one has been exposed to the virus, so vaccination or receiving immunoglobulin after exposure does not prevent progression to illness.

For people who are infected or suspected to be infected, isolation is important in preventing the spread of the disease. This includes abstaining from school, childcare, work, and other settings in which people gather together. In healthcare settings, it is recommended that healthcare workers use precautions such as face masks to reduce the likelihood of infection and to abstain from work if they develop mumps. Additional measures taken in health care facilities include reducing wait times for mumps patients, having mumps patients wear masks, and cleaning and disinfecting areas that mumps patients use. The virus can be inactivated using formalin, ether, chloroform, heat, or ultraviolet light.

== Treatment ==
Mumps is usually self-limiting, and no specific antiviral treatments exist for it, so treatment is aimed at alleviating symptoms and preventing complications. Non-medicinal ways to manage the disease include bed rest, using ice or heat packs on the neck and scrotum, consuming more fluids, eating soft food, and gargling with warm salt water. Anti-fever medications may be used during the febrile period, excluding aspirin when given to children, which may cause Reye syndrome. Analgesics may also be provided to control pain from mumps inflammatory conditions. For seizures, anticonvulsants may be used. In severe neurological cases, ventilators may be used to support breathing.

Intramuscular mumps immunoglobulin may be of benefit when administered early in some cases, but it has not shown benefit in outbreaks. Although not recommended, intravenous immunoglobulin therapy may reduce the rates of some complications. Antibiotics may be used as a precaution in cases in which bacterial infection cannot be ruled out as well as to prevent secondary bacterial infection. Autoimmune-based disorders connected to mumps are treatable with intravenous immunoglobulin.

Various types of treatment for mumps orchitis have been used, but no specific treatment is recommended due to each method's limitations. These measures are primarily based on relieving testicular pain and reducing intratesticular pressure to reduce the likelihood of testicular atrophy. Interferon-α2α interferes with viral replication, so it has been postulated to be useful in preventing testicular damage and infertility. Interferon alfa-2b may reduce the duration of symptoms and incidence of complications. In cases of hydrocele formation, excess fluid can be removed.

Acupuncture has been used fairly widely in China to treat children who have mumps, however, no high-quality trials have been conducted to determine the safety or effectiveness of this treatment approach.

== Prognosis ==
The prognosis for most people who experience mumps is excellent as long-term complications and death are rare. Hospitalization is typically not required. Mumps is usually self-limiting and symptoms resolve spontaneously within two weeks as the immune system clears the virus from the body. In high-risk groups such as immunocompromised persons, the prognosis is considered to be the same as for other groups. For most people, infection leads to lifelong immunity against future infection. Reinfections appear to be more mild and atypical than the first infection. The overall case-fatality rate of mumps is 1.6–3.8 people per 10,000, and these deaths typically occur in those who develop encephalitis.

Mumps orchitis typically resolves within two weeks. In 20% of cases, the testicles may be tender for a few more weeks. Atrophy, or reduction of size, of the involved testicle occurs in 30–50% of orchitis cases, which may lead to abnormalities in sperm creation and fertility such as low sperm count, absence of sperm in semen, reduced sperm motility, reduced fertility (hypofertility) in 13% of cases, and rarely sterility. Hypofertility can, however, occur in cases without atrophy. Abnormalities in sperm creation can persist for months to years after recovery from the initial infection, the length of which increases as the severity of orchitis increases. Examination of these cases shows decreased testicular volume, tenderness of the testicles, and a feeling of inconsistency when handling the testicles. Infertility is linked to severe cases of orchitis affecting both testes followed by testicular atrophy, which may develop up to one year after the initial infection. Of bilateral orchitis cases, 30–87% experience infertility. There is a weak association between orchitis and later development of epididymitis and testicular tumors.

Mumps meningitis typically resolves within 3–10 days without long-term complications. In meningoencephalitis cases, higher protein levels in CSF and a lower CSF glucose to blood glucose ratio are associated with longer periods of hospitalization. Approximately 1% of those whose CNS is affected die from mumps. Post-infectious encephalitis tends to be relatively mild, whereas post-infectious encephalomyelitis has a case-fatality rate of up to ten percent. Most cases of mumps deafness affect just one ear and are temporary, but permanent hearing loss occurs in 0.005% of infections. Myocarditis and pericarditis that occur as a result of mumps may lead to endocardial fibroelastosis, i.e. thickening of the endocardium. With extreme rarity, infertility and premature menopause have occurred as a result of mumps oophoritis.

== Epidemiology ==
=== Clinical age and immunity ===
Mumps is found worldwide. In the absence of vaccination against mumps there are between 100 and 1,000 cases per 100,000 people each year, i.e. 0.1% to 1.0% of the population are infected each year. The number of cases peaks every 2–5 years, with incidence highest in children 5–9 years old. According to seroconversion surveys done before the start of mumps vaccination, a sharp increase in mumps antibody levels at age 2–3 was observed.

Furthermore, 50% of 4–6 year olds, 90% of 14–15 year olds, and 95% of adults had tested positive to prior exposure to mumps, indicating that nearly all people are eventually infected in unvaccinated populations.

Prior to the start of vaccination, mumps accounted for ten percent of meningitis cases and about a third of encephalitis cases. Worldwide, mumps is the most common cause of inflammation of the salivary glands. In children, mumps is the most common cause of deafness in one ear in cases when the inner ear is damaged. Asymptomatic infections are more common in adults, and the rate of asymptomatic infections is very high, up to two-thirds, in vaccinated populations. Mumps vaccination has the effect of increasing the average age of the infected in vaccinated populations that have not previously experienced a mumps outbreak. While infection rates appear to be the same in males and females, males appear to experience symptoms and complications, including neurological involvement, at a higher rate than females. Symptoms are more severe in adolescents and adults than in children.

=== Settings of outbreaks ===
It is common for outbreaks of mumps to occur. These outbreaks typically occur in crowded spaces where the virus can spread from person to person easily, such as schools, military barracks, prisons, and sports clubs. Since the introduction of vaccines, the frequency of mumps has declined dramatically, as have complications caused by mumps. The epidemiology in countries that vaccinate reflects the number of doses administered, age at vaccination, and vaccination rates. If vaccine coverage is insufficient, then herd immunity may be unobtainable and the average age of infection will increase, leading to an increase in the prevalence of complications. Risk factors include age, exposure to a person with mumps, compromised immunity, time of year, travel history, and vaccination status. Mumps vaccination is less common in developing countries, which consequently have higher rates of mumps.

Cases peak in different seasons of the year in different regions. In temperate climates, cases peak in winter and spring, whereas in tropical regions no seasonality is observed. Additional research has shown that mumps increases in frequency as temperature and humidity increase. The seasonality of mumps is thought to be caused by several factors: fluctuation in the human immune response due to seasonal factors, such as changes in melatonin levels; behavior and lifestyle changes, such as school attendance and indoor crowding; and meteorological factors such as changes in temperature, brightness, wind, and humidity.
