= Gymnopilus chrysimyces =

Scientific classification
- Kingdom: Fungi
- Division: Basidiomycota
- Class: Agaricomycetes
- Order: Agaricales
- Family: Hymenogastraceae
- Genus: Gymnopilus
- Species: G. chrysimyces

Binomial name
- Gymnopilus chrysimyces (Berk.) Manjula

Species of fungus

Gymnopilus chrysimyces Mycological characteristics
- Gills on hymenium
- Cap is convex
- Hymenium is adnexed or adnate
- Ecology is saprotrophic

Gymnopilus chrysimyces is a species of mushroom in the family Hymenogastraceae.

== Medicinal ==
In a 1982 study, this species was shown to contain hemagglutinins. Proteins from G. chrysimyces showed activity towards rat erythrocytes, while proteins from Lentinus squarrosulus showed activity towards guinea pig and mouse erythrocytes. The agglutination of proteins from the two species showed that both have more than one hemagglutinin.

== See also ==
List of Gymnopilus species
