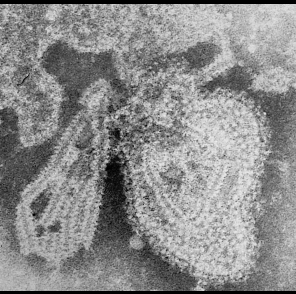
- TEM micrograph of a Mumps orthorubulavirus particle

Virus classification
- (unranked): Virus
- Realm: Riboviria
- Kingdom: Orthornavirae
- Phylum: Negarnaviricota
- Class: Monjiviricetes
- Order: Mononegavirales
- Family: Paramyxoviridae
- Subfamily: Rubulavirinae

Genera
- Orthorubulavirus; Pararubulavirus

= Rubulavirinae =

Subfamily of viruses

Rubulavirinae is a subfamily of viruses in the family Paramyxoviridae. Humans, apes, pigs, and dogs serve as natural hosts. There are currently 18 species in the two genera Orthorubulavirus and Pararubulavirus. Diseases associated with this genus include mumps. Members of the subfamily are collectively called rubulaviruses. The subfamily was previously a genus named Rubulavirus but was elevated to subfamily in 2018. Viruses of this subfamily appear to be most closely related to members of Avulavirinae.

== Taxonomy ==
Subfamily: Rubulavirinae

Genus: Orthorubulavirus
Genus: Pararubulavirus

== Structure ==
Rubulavirions are enveloped, with spherical geometries. The diameter is around 150 nm. Rubulavirus genomes are linear, around 15kb in length. The genome codes for 8 proteins.

| Genus | Structure | Symmetry | Capsid | Genomic arrangement | Genomic segmentation |
|---|---|---|---|---|---|
| Rubulavirus | Spherical | | Enveloped | Linear | Monopartite |

== Life cycle ==
Viral replication is cytoplasmic. Entry into the host cells is achieved after viral attachment to host cells. Replication follows the negative stranded RNA virus replication model. Negative-stranded RNA virus transcription, using polymerase stuttering, through co-transcriptional RNA editing is the method of transcription. The virus exits the host cell by budding. Humans, apes, pigs, and dogs serve as the natural host. Transmission routes are respiratory and saliva.

| Genus | Host details | Tissue tropism | Entry details | Release details | Replication site | Assembly site | Transmission |
|---|---|---|---|---|---|---|---|
| Rubulavirus | Humans; apes; pigs; dogs | None | Glycoprotein | Budding | Cytoplasm | Cytoplasm | Aerosols; saliva |

== Clinical symptoms ==
The virus often infects children and adults who have evaded the virus during childhood. It is associated with mild upper respiratory symptoms and swelling of the salivary glands including the parotid gland. The virus also has the potential to infect testis, CNS and pancreas.
