= Pararubulavirus =

Virus classification
- (unranked): Virus
- Realm: Riboviria
- Kingdom: Orthornavirae
- Phylum: Negarnaviricota
- Class: Monjiviricetes
- Order: Mononegavirales
- Family: Paramyxoviridae
- Subfamily: Rubulavirinae
- Genus: Pararubulavirus

Genus of viruses

Pararubulavirus is a genus of viruses in the family Paramyxoviridae.

== Species ==
The genus contains the following species:

- Pararubulavirus accraense
- Pararubulavirus achimotaense
- Pararubulavirus cantonense
- Pararubulavirus eidoli
- Pararubulavirus guangdongense
- Pararubulavirus herveyense
- Pararubulavirus hongkongi
- Pararubulavirus menangleense
- Pararubulavirus sosugaense
- Pararubulavirus teviotense
- Pararubulavirus tiomanense
