= Viral plaque =

Visible structure formed by virus propagation within a cell culture

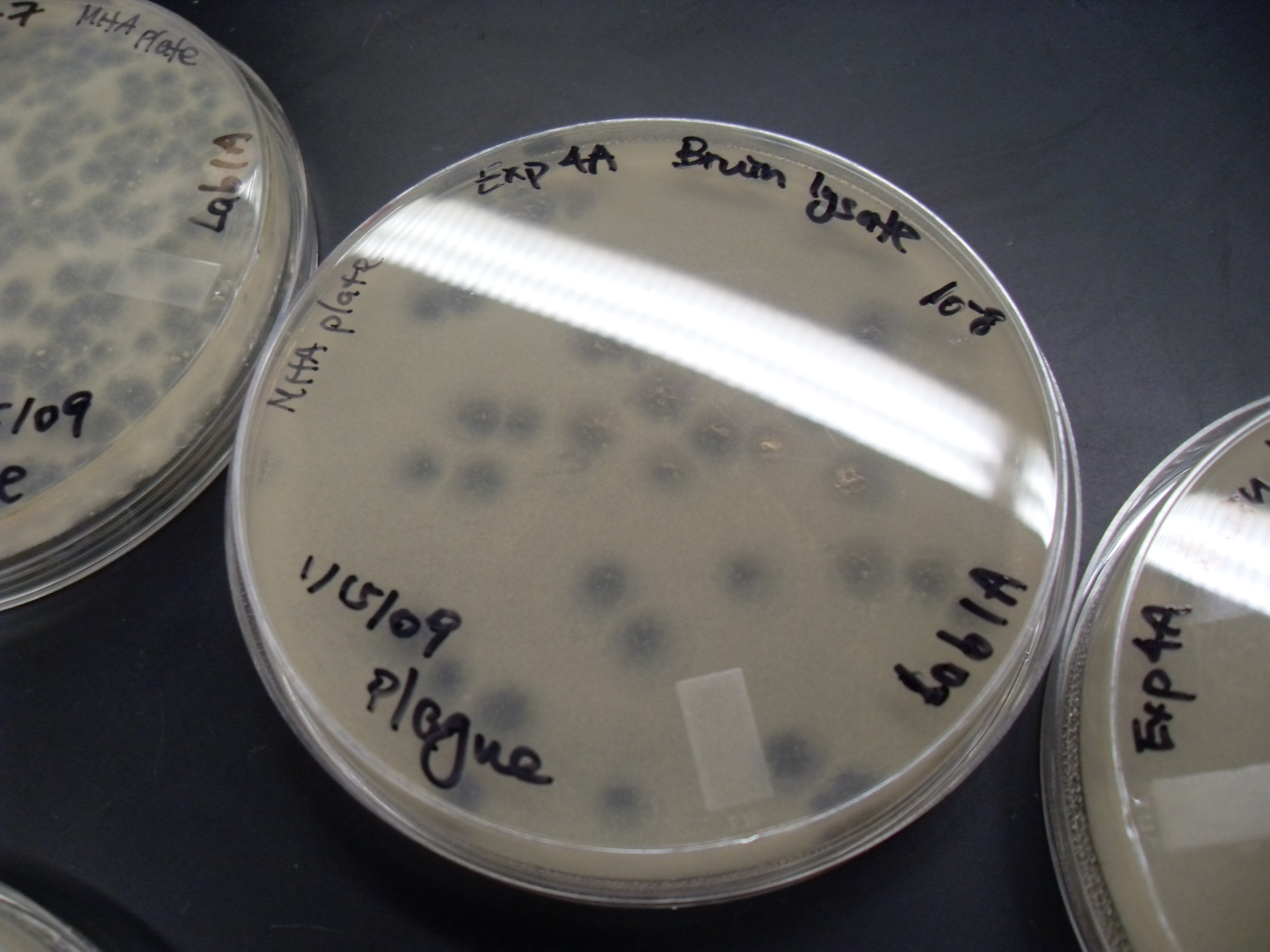
Plaques from a virus isolated from a compost heap near UCLA. The bacterium is M. smegmatis.

A viral plaque is a visible structure formed after introducing a viral sample to a cell culture grown on some nutrient medium. The virus will replicate and spread, generating regions of cell destruction known as plaques. For example, Vero cell or other tissue cultures may be used to investigate an influenza virus or coronavirus, while various bacterial cultures would be used for bacteriophages.

Counting the number of plaques can be used as a method of virus quantification. These plaques can sometimes be detected visually using colony counters, in much the same way as bacterial colonies are counted; however, they are not always visible to the naked eye, and sometimes can only be seen through a microscope, or using techniques such as staining (e.g. neutral red for eukaryotes or giemsa for bacteria) or immunofluorescence. Special computer systems have been designed with the ability to scan samples in batches.

The appearance of the plaque depends on the host strain, virus and the conditions. Highly virulent or lytic strains create plaques that look clear (due to total cell destruction), while strains that only kill a fraction of their hosts (due to partial resistance/lysogeny), or only reduce the rate of cell growth, give turbid plaques. Some partially lysogenic phages give bull's-eye plaques with spots or rings of growth in the middle of clear regions of complete lysis.

== See also ==
- Assay
- Viral culture
- Virus
- Virus quantification
- Virology
