= Titer =

Way of expressing concentration

Titer (American English) or titre (British English) is a way of expressing concentration. Titer testing employs serial dilution to obtain approximate quantitative information from an analytical procedure that inherently only evaluates as positive or negative. The titer corresponds to the highest dilution factor that still yields a positive reading. For example, positive readings in the first 8 serial, twofold dilutions translate into a titer of 1:256 (i.e., 2^{−8}). Titres are sometimes expressed by the denominator only, for example 1:256 is written 256.

The term also has two other, conflicting meanings. In titration, the titer is the ratio of actual to nominal concentration of a titrant, e.g. a titer of 0.5 would require 1/0.5 = 2 times more titrant than nominal. This is to compensate for possible degradation of the titrant solution. Second, in textile engineering, titre is also a synonym for linear density.

== Etymology ==
Titer has the same origin as the word "title", from the French word titre, meaning "title" but referring to the documented purity of a substance, often gold or silver. This comes from the Latin word titulus, also meaning "title".

== Examples ==
=== Antibody titer ===
An antibody titer is a measurement of how much antibody an organism has produced that recognizes a particular epitope. It is conventionally expressed as the inverse of the greatest dilution level that still gives a positive result on some test. ELISA is a common means of determining antibody titers. For example, the indirect Coombs test detects the presence of anti-Rh antibodies in a pregnant woman's blood serum. A patient might be reported to have an "indirect Coombs titer" of 16. This means that the patient's serum gives a positive indirect Coombs test at any dilution down to 1/16 (1 part serum to 15 parts diluent). At greater dilutions the indirect Coombs test is negative. If a few weeks later the same patient had an indirect Coombs titer of 32 (1/32 dilution which is 1 part serum to 31 parts diluent), this would mean that she was making more anti-Rh antibody, since it took a greater dilution to abolish the positive test.

Many traditional serological tests such as hemagglutination or complement fixation employ this principle. Such tests can typically be read visually, which makes them fast, cost-effective, and able to be deployed in a wide variety of laboratory environments. The interpretation of any serological titer result is guided by reference values that are specific to the antigen or antibody in question, so a titer of 1:32 may be below the cut-off for one test but above for another.

=== Other examples ===
A viral titer is the lowest concentration of a virus that still infects cells. To determine the titer, several dilutions are prepared, such as 10^{−1}, 10^{−2}, 10^{−3}, ... 10^{−8}.

The titer of a fat is the temperature, in degrees Celsius, at which it solidifies. The higher the titer, the harder the fat. This titer is used in determining whether an animal fat is considered tallow (titer higher than 40 °C) or a grease (titer below 40 °C).

== See also ==
- Serology
- Titration
- W/v
- Mg%
- Virus quantification
- Viral titer
