= Hemagglutination assay =

Measure of virus or bacteria concentration

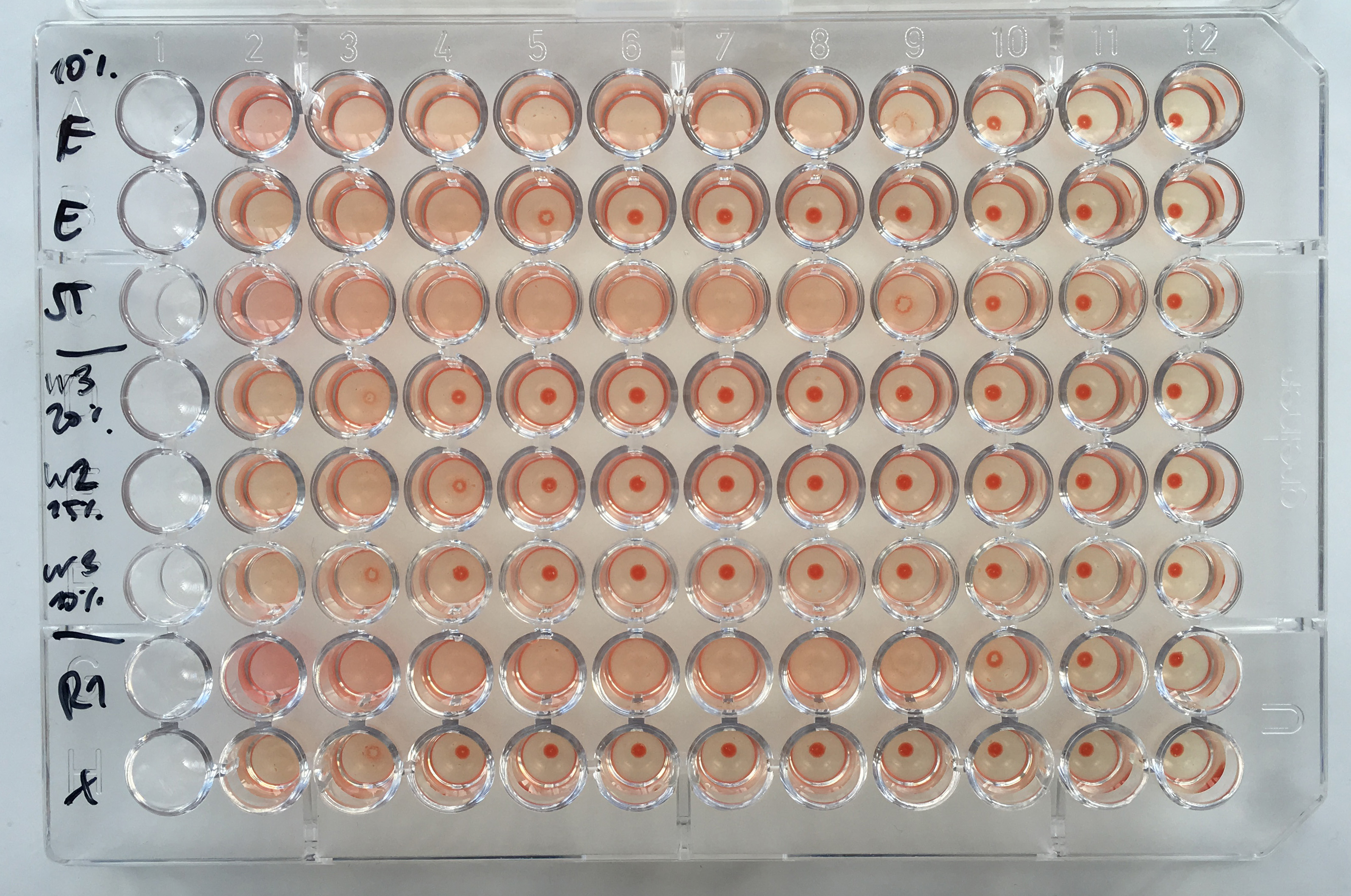
Hemagglutination assay of different influenza samples diluted from the left to the right.

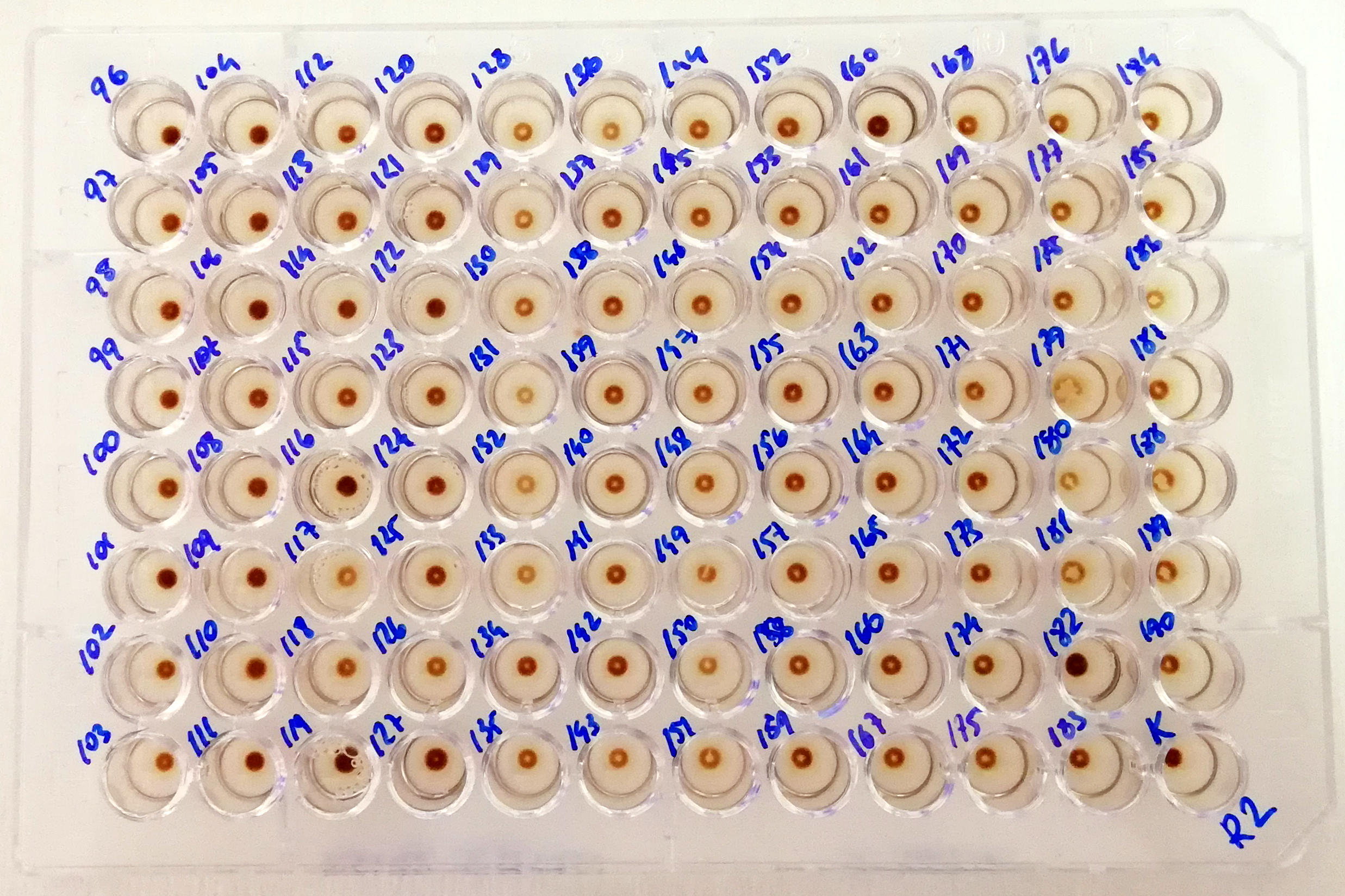
Indirect hemagglutination assay for human echinococcosis. Different serum samples diluted from the left to the right. Seropositivity was suspected in Sample 179

The hemagglutination assay or haemagglutination assay (HA) and the hemagglutination inhibition assay (HI or HAI) were developed in 1941–42 by American virologist George Hirst as methods for quantifying the relative concentration of viruses, bacteria, or antibodies.

HA and HAI apply the process of hemagglutination, in which sialic acid receptors on the surface of red blood cells (RBCs) bind to the hemagglutinin glycoprotein found on the surface of influenza virus (and several other viruses) and create a network, or lattice structure, of interconnected RBCs and virus particles. The agglutinated lattice maintains the RBCs in a suspended distribution, typically viewed as a diffuse reddish solution. The formation of the lattice depends on the concentrations of the virus and RBCs, and when the relative virus concentration is too low, the RBCs are not constrained by the lattice and settle to the bottom of the well. Hemagglutination is observed in the presence of staphylococci, vibrios, and other bacterial species, similar to the mechanism viruses use to cause agglutination of erythrocytes. The RBCs used in HA and HI assays are typically from chickens, turkeys, horses, guinea pigs, or humans depending on the selectivity of the targeted virus or bacterium and the associated surface receptors on the RBC.

== Procedure ==
A general procedure for HA is as follows, a serial dilution of virus is prepared across the rows in a U or V- bottom shaped 96-well microtiter plate. The most concentrated sample in the first well is often diluted to be 1/5x of the stock, and subsequent wells are typically two-fold dilutions (1/10, 1/20, 1/40, etc.).The final well serves as a negative control with no virus. Each row of the plate typically has a different virus and the same pattern of dilutions. After serial dilutions, a standardized concentration of RBCs is added to each well and mixed gently. The plate is incubated for 30 minutes at room temperature. Following the incubation period, the assay can be analyzed to distinguish between agglutinated and non-agglutinated wells. The images across a row will typically progress from agglutinated wells with high virus concentration and a diffuse reddish appearance to a series of wells with low virus concentrations containing a dark red pellet, or button, in the center of the well. The low concentration wells appear nearly identical to the no-virus negative control well. The button appearance occurs because the RBCs are not held in the agglutinated lattice structure and settle into the low point of the U or V-bottom well. The transition from agglutinated to non-agglutinated wells occurs distinctively, within 1 to 2 wells.

The relative concentration, or titer, of the virus sample is based on the well with the last agglutinated appearance, immediately before a pellet is observed. Relative to the initial viral stock concentration, the virus concentration in this well will be some dilution of the stock, for example, 1/40-fold. The titer value of that sample is the inverse of the dilution, i.e., 40. In some cases, the virus is initially so dilute that agglutinated wells are never observed. In that case, the titer of these samples is commonly assigned as 5, indicating the highest possible concentration, but the accuracy of that value is clearly low. Alternatively, if the relative concentration of the virus is extremely high and the wells never transition to a button appearance. The titer value is then commonly assigned to be the highest dilution, such as 5120.

HI is closely related to the HA assay, but includes anti-viral antibodies as “inhibitors” to interfere with the virus-RBC interaction. The goal is to characterize the concentration of antibodies in the antiserum or other samples containing antibodies. The HI assay is generally performed by creating a dilution series of antiserum across the rows of a 96-well microtiter plate. Each row would usually be a different sample. A standardized amount of virus or bacteria is added to each well, and the mixture is allowed to incubate at room temperature for 30 minutes. The last well in each row would be a negative control with no virus added. During the incubation, antibodies bind to the viral particles, and if the concentration and binding affinity of the antibodies are high enough, the viral particles are effectively blocked from causing hemagglutination. Next, a standardized amount of RBCs is added to each well and allowed to incubate at room temperature for an additional 30 minutes. The resulting HI plate images usually progress from non-agglutinated, “button” wells with high antibody concentration to agglutinated, red diffuse wells with low antibody concentration. The HI titer value is the inverse of the last dilution of serum that completely inhibited hemagglutination.

The preceding descriptions of the HA and HI processes are generalized, and specific details can vary depending on the operator and laboratory. For example, serial dilutions across the rows is described, but some laboratories use an alternate orientation and perform dilutions down the columns instead. Similarly, the starting dilution, serial dilution factor, incubation times, and choice of U or V-bottom plate can depend on the specific laboratory.

== Advantages ==
HA and HI have the advantages that the assays are simple, use relatively inexpensive and available instruments and supplies, and provide results within a few hours. The assays are also well established in many laboratories around the world, allowing some measure of credibility, comparison, and standardization.

== Limitations ==
Optimal and reliable results require controlling several variables, such as incubation times, red blood cell concentration, and type of red blood cell. Non-specific factors in the sample can lead to interference and incorrect titer values. For example, molecules in the sample other than virus-specific antibodies can inhibit agglutination between virus and RBCs, as well as potentially blocking antibody from binding to virus. Receptor-destroying enzymes (RDE) are commonly used to treat samples prior to analysis to prevent non-specific inhibition. Analysis of the HA or HI results relies on a qualified individual to read the plate and determine the titer values. The manual interpretation method introduces more opportunities for discrepancies in the assay because results can be subjective and the agreement between human readers is inconsistent. Also, there is no digital record of the plate or titer determinations so the initial interpretation is tedious and commonly done in replicates. The range of potential variables and differences between expert readers can make comparing inter-laboratory results difficult.

== See also ==
- Hemagglutination
- Virus quantification
