= Measles hemagglutinin =

Protein produced by measles virus

Hemagglutinin

Identifiers
- Organism: Measles virus (strain Edmonston)
- Symbol: H
- PDB: 2RKC
- UniProt: P08362
Search for
- Structures: Swiss-model
- Domains: InterPro

Measles hemagglutinin is a hemagglutinin produced by measles virus.

It attaches to CD46 using a dead neuraminidase domain.
