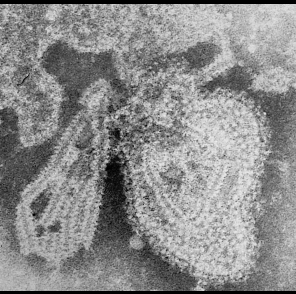
- TEM micrograph of a mumps virus particle

Virus classification
- (unranked): Virus
- Realm: Riboviria
- Kingdom: Orthornavirae
- Phylum: Negarnaviricota
- Class: Monjiviricetes
- Order: Mononegavirales
- Family: Paramyxoviridae
- Genus: Orthorubulavirus
- Species: Orthorubulavirus parotitidis

Synonyms
- Mumps orthorubulavirus; Mumps rubulavirus; Mumps virus

= Mumps virus =

Viral agent that causes mumps

The mumps virus (MuV) is the virus that causes mumps. MuV contains a single-stranded, negative-sense genome made of ribonucleic acid (RNA). Its genome is about 15,000 nucleotides in length and contains seven genes that encode nine proteins. The genome is encased by a capsid that is in turn surrounded by a viral envelope. MuV particles, called virions, are pleomorphic in shape and vary in size from 100 to 600 nanometers in diameter. One serotype and twelve genotypes that vary in their geographic distribution are recognized. Humans are the only natural host of the mumps virus.

MuV replicates first by binding to the surface of cells, whereby its envelope merges with the host cell membrane to release the capsid inside of the cell. Once inside, the viral RNA-dependent RNA polymerase transcribes messenger RNA (mRNA) from the genome and later replicates the genome. After translation of viral proteins, virions are formed adjacent to the cell membrane, where they then leave the cell by budding from its surface, using the cell membrane as the envelope.

The mumps virus was first identified as the cause of mumps in 1934 and was first isolated in 1945. Within a few years after isolation, vaccines protecting against MuV infection had been developed. MuV was first recognized as a species in 1971, and it has been given the scientific name Orthorubulavirus parotitidis. It is assigned to the genus Orthorubulavirus in the subfamily Rubulavirinae, family Paramyxoviridae.

== Characteristics ==
=== Genome ===
The mumps virus contains a nonsegmented, single-stranded, linear genome that is 15,384 nucleotides in length and made of ribonucleic acid (RNA). The genome has negative sense, so mRNA can be transcribed directly from the genome. Mumps virus encodes seven genes in the following order:

- nucleocapsid (N) protein,
- V/P/I (V/phospho-(P)/I) proteins,
- matrix (M) protein, the most abundant protein in virions,
- fusion (F) protein,
- small hydrophobic (SH) transmembrane protein,
- hemagglutinin-neuraminidase (HN), and
- the large (L) protein, which combines with the P protein to form the RNA-dependent RNA polymerase (RdRp). RdRp acts as both a replicase to replicate the genome and as a transcriptase to transcribe mRNA from the genome.

The SH protein is thought to be involved in blocking NF(α)-mediated apoptosis of the host cell, which is done as an antiviral response to suppress the spread of viruses, though SH is not necessary for replication since MuVs engineered without SH are still able to replicate. The V protein is also involved in evading host antiviral responses by means of inhibiting production and signalling of interferons. Unlike the other proteins, the I protein's function is unknown.

=== Structure ===
The genome of the mumps virus is encased by N proteins to form a flexible, loosely coiled helical ribonucleoprotein (RNP) complex consisting of the genome surrounded by a nucleocapsid that RdRp is bound to. RNPs are surrounded by an envelope, a lipid membrane, which contains two types of spikes on its surface that correspond to the HN and F glycoproteins. M proteins are found on the inner side of the envelope, connecting the envelope to the RNP. Virions vary in size from 100 to 600 nanometers (nm) in diameter and are pleomorphic in shape.

=== Life cycle ===
MuV first interacts with a host cell by binding to its surface via the HN protein's receptor, sialic acid, which binds to sialic acid receptors on the surface of host cells. Following attachment, the F protein is triggered and begins fusing the viral envelope with the host cell's membrane. The F protein does so by changing from a metastable state to refolding to a more stable hairpin structure, which allows the contents of the virion, including the RNP, to be released into the host cell's cytoplasm.

Upon entering the host cell, the RdRp begins transcribing mRNA from the genome inside the RNP. Transcription starts at or near the 3'-end (usually pronounced "three prime end") at a promoter region and moves sequentially toward the 5'-end. One mRNA strand is transcribed for each gene, and it is necessary for all genes sequentially before a gene to be transcribed for that gene to be transcribed. Genes closer to the 3'-end are transcribed at the highest frequency, decreasing in frequency as RdRp approaches the 5'-end. RdRp synthesizes a cap on the 5'-end of the mRNA and a polyadenylated tail on the 3'-end consisting of hundreds of consecutive adenines. Once a gene has been transcribed, RdRp releases it into the cytoplasm for subsequent translation of viral proteins by host ribosomes. The V and P proteins are encoded by the same gene, so while transcribing mRNA, RdRp edits the mRNA by inserting two non-templated guanines into the mRNA to transcribes mRNA for the P protein.

Later in the replication cycle, once a sufficient number of nucleoproteins are present after translation, RdRp switches functions to replicate the genome. This occurs in a two-step process: first, a positive-sense antigenome is synthesized by RdRp from the negative-sense genome, and second, negative-sense genomic RNA strands are in turn synthesized by RdRp from the antigenome. During this process, the antigenome and newly replicated genomes are encapsidated by the nucleoprotein at the same time as replication. Progeny genomes can be used for additional transcription or replication or may simply be packaged into progeny virions.

HN and F proteins are synthesized in the endoplasmic reticulum and travel through the Golgi complex to the cell membrane, whether they bind to the cell membrane and protrude from the surface of the cell. M proteins bind to the sites of the cell membrane where HN and F proteins are, doing so at the positions where their "tails" protrude into the inside of the cell membrane in the cytoplasm. M proteins then act as a signals to newly synthesized RNPs as to where virions are to be formed. The interaction of RNP and M proteins is then thought to trigger budding from the host cell.

Budding from the host cell begins once M proteins recruit host class E proteins that form endosomal sorting complex required for transport (ESCRT) structures at the site of budding. There, ESCRT proteins form into concentric spirals and push the contents of the virion outward from the cell in the form of a vesicle that protrudes from the cell. The ESCRT proteins then constrict the opening of the vesicle and terminate budding by cutting off the vesicle from the rest of the membrane, forming a complete virion that is released from the host cell. During this process, the neuraminidase of HN proteins aids in separation from the host membrane and prevents virion aggregation.

=== Diversity ===
The mumps virus has one serotype and twelve genotypes. The genotypes can be distinguished based on the F, SH, are HN genes. The SH gene has a degree of variation between genotypes ranging from 5% to 21%, the highest among MuV's genes. The genotypes are named genotypes A to N, excluding E and M, i.e. genotypes A, B, C, D, F, G, H, I, J, K, L, and N. Genotypes E and M were previously recognized but were abolished due to phylogenetic analysis that MuVs assigned to them instead belonged genotypes C and K, respectively.

The different genotypes vary in frequency from region to region. For example, genotypes C, D, H, and J are more common in the western hemisphere, whereas genotypes F, G, and I are more common in Asia, although genotype G is considered to be a global genotype. Genotypes A and B have not been observed in the wild since the 1990s. This diversity of MuV is not reflected in the antibody response since because there is only one serotype, antibodies to one genotype are also functional against all others.

=== Evolution ===
The F, SH, HN genes, used to distinguish genotypes, are estimated to experience genetic mutations at a rate of 0.25 · 10^{−3} substitutions per site per year, which is considered to be a very low mutation rate for an RNA virus. Phylogenetic analysis of the entire SH gene indicates that genotypes A and J are related in one branch and split apart from the other genotypes. In that second branch, genotype I is a sister clade of the other genotypes, which cluster into five sequential sister clades: G and H; D and K; C; L; and B, F, and N.

== Disease ==
Humans are the only natural host of the mumps virus, which causes mumps. The disease is transmitted via contact with respiratory secretions such as aerosolized droplets and saliva. Infection leads to fever, muscle pain, and painful swelling of the parotid glands, two salivary glands situated on the sides of the mouth in front of the ears. Infection may also involve many other tissues and organs, resulting in a variety of inflammatory reactions such as encephalitis, aseptic meningitis, orchitis, myocarditis, pancreatitis, nephritis, oophoritis, and mastitis. Mumps is usually not life-threatening and typically resolves within a few weeks after the onset of symptoms, but long-term complications such as paralysis, seizures, hydrocephalus, and deafness can occur. Treatment is supportive in nature, and infection is preventable via vaccination.

== Classification ==
Mumps virus, scientific name Orthorubulavirus parotitidis, is assigned to the genus Orthorubulavirus, in the subfamily Rubulavirinae, family Paramyxoviridae. Strains of MuV are named and classified using the following system:

- MuVs (RNA sequence derived from clinical material) or MuVi (RNA sequence derived from cell culture)
- City.Country ISO3 code
- Week number.year, the date of onset of when the disease occurred, or the date of specimen collection if the disease onset date is unknown, or the date the sample was received in the laboratory if the two prior dates are unknown
- replicate in week
- [genotype], which indicates which genotype the strain belongs to
- (VAC), which is used to indicate strains derived from cases with a history of vaccination and with vaccine virus detected

This system is used in sequential order. For example, MuVs/NewYork.USA/17.11[B] (VAC) is a vaccine-associated genotype B MuV derived from clinical material in New York City, and MuVi/London.GBR/3.12/2[G] is a genotype G MuV derived from cell culture in London.

== History ==
In 1934, mumps was identified as a viral disease by Claude D. Johnson and Ernest William Goodpasture. They found that rhesus macaques exposed to saliva taken from humans in the early stages of the disease developed mumps. Furthermore, they showed that mumps could be transferred to children via filtered and sterilized, bacteria-less preparations of macerated monkey parotid tissue, showing that it was a viral disease. The mumps virus was isolated for the first time in 1945 and by 1948 the first mumps vaccine had been developed.

Initial vaccines contained inactivated virus particles and provided short-term protection against mumps. In the 1960s, Maurice Hilleman developed a more effective mumps vaccine using live virus particles that were taken from his then five-year-old infected daughter, Jeryl Lynn. This vaccine was approved for use in 1967 and recommended in 1977, replacing prior vaccines that were less effective. Hilleman would also work to develop the MMR vaccine in 1971, effective against measles, mumps, and rubella. The "Jeryl Lynn" strain of the mumps virus, which belongs to genotype A, continues to be used in vaccines against mumps.

Mumps virus was recognized as a species in 1971 by the International Committee on Taxonomy of Viruses (ICTV), which oversees virus taxonomy, when it was assigned to the genus Paramyxovirus. Since then, it has undergone numerous taxonomic changes and changes to its scientific name:

- In 1995, Mumps virus was established as the type species of the newly established genus Rubulavirus.
- In 2016, Mumps virus was renamed to Mumps rubulavirus.
- In 2018, Mumps rubulavirus was renamed to Mumps orthorubulavirus to accompany Rubulavirus being abolished and replaced with the subfamily Rubulavirinae bearing the same name and the newly established genus Orthorubulavirus.
- In 2020, type species in virus taxonomy were abolished, so Mumps orthorubulavirus was removed as the type species of Orthorubulavirus.
- In 2023, Mumps orthorubulavirus was renamed to Orthorubulavirus parotitidis.

=== Etymology ===
The word "mumps" is first attested circa 1600 and is the plural form of "mump", meaning "grimace", originally a verb meaning "to whine or mutter like a beggar". The disease was likely called mumps in reference to the swelling caused by mumps parotitis, reflecting its impact on facial expressions as well as its causing of painful, difficult swallowing. "Mumps" was also used starting from the 17th century to mean "a fit of melancholy, sullenness, silent displeasure".
