= Animal virus =

Viruses that infect animals

Animal viruses are viruses that infect animals. Viruses infect all cellular life and although viruses infect every animal, plant, fungus and protist species, each has its own specific range of viruses that often infect only that species.

== Vertebrates ==
The viruses of vertebrates are informally distinguished between those that primarily cause infections of humans and those that infect other animals. The two fields of study are called medical (or clinical) virology and veterinary virology respectively. Although not the first viruses to be discovered and characterised, those that cause infections of humans are the most studied. Different viruses can infect all the organs and tissues of the body and the outcomes range from mild or no symptoms, to life-threatening diseases. Humans cannot be infected by plant or insect viruses, but they are susceptible to infections with viruses from other vertebrates. These are called viral zoonoses or zoonotic infections. Examples include, rabies, yellow fever and pappataci fever.

The viruses that infect other vertebrates are related to those of humans and most families of viruses that cause human diseases are represented. They are important pathogens of livestock and cause diseases such as foot-and-mouth disease and bluetongue. Jersey and Guernsey breeds of cattle are particularly susceptible to pox viruses, with symptoms characterised by widespread, unsightly skin lesions. And most people have heard of myxomatosis, which is a fatal pox virus infection of rabbits: once infected they die within twelve days. The virus was deliberately released in Australia in 1950, in an attempt to control the exponentially growing rabbit population. Rabbits had been brought to the continent in 1859 for sport, and having no natural predators, bred at an extraordinary rate. The infection killed 99.8 percent of rabbits, but by the late 1950s, Australian rabbits started to become immune to the virus and the population of rabbits increased, but never to the vast numbers seen before 1950.

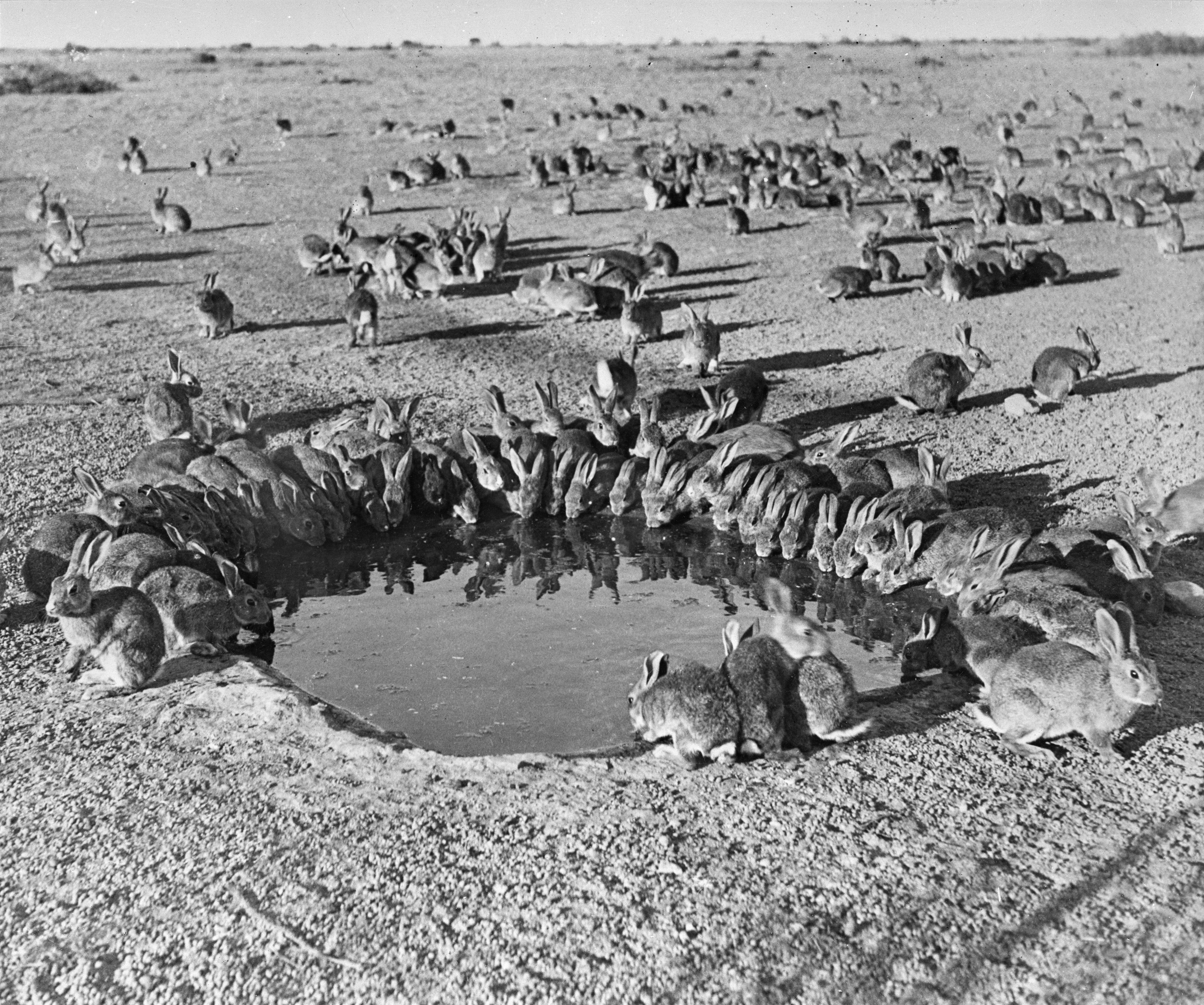
Rabbits around a waterhole during the myxomatosis trial at the site on Wardang Island, South Australia in 1938

Companion animals such as cats, dogs, and horses, if not vaccinated, can catch serious viral infections. Canine parvovirus 2 is caused by a small DNA virus, and infections are often fatal in pups. The emergence of the parvovirus in the 1970s was the most significant in the history of infectious diseases. The disease spread rapidly across the world, and thousands of dogs died from the infection. The virus originated in cats, the vector of feline panleukopenia, but a mutation that changed just two amino acids in the viral capsid protein VP2 allowed it to cross the species barrier, and dogs, unlike cats, had no resistance to the disease. Canine distemper virus is closely related to measles virus and is the most important viral disease of dogs. The disease (which was first described in 1760, by Edward Jenner, the pioneer of smallpox vaccination, is highly contagious, but is well controlled by vaccination. In the 1990s, thousands of African lions died from the infection, which they contracted from feral dogs and hyenas.

Marine mammals are susceptible to viral infections. In 1988 and 2002, thousands of harbor seals were killed in Europe by the measles-like phocine distemper virus. Large outbreaks of the disease were recorded among the seal populations of Lake Baikal and along the shores of the Baltic and North Sea. The infection resembled canine distemper; the animals died within two weeks of respiratory distress and many aborted pups were seen. Many other viruses, including caliciviruses, herpesviruses, adenoviruses and parvoviruses, circulate in marine mammal populations.

Fish too have their viruses. They are particularly prone to infections with rhabdoviruses, which are distinct from, but related to rabies virus. At least nine types of rhabdovirus cause economically important diseases in species including salmon, pike, perch, sea bass, carp and cod. The symptoms include anaemia, bleeding, lethargy and a mortality rate that is affected by the temperature of the water. In hatcheries the diseases are often controlled by increasing the temperature to 15–18 °C. Like all vertebrates, fish suffer from herpes viruses. These ancient viruses have co-evolved with their hosts and are highly species-specific. In fish, they cause cancerous tumours and non-cancerous growths called hyperplasia.

== Invertebrates ==
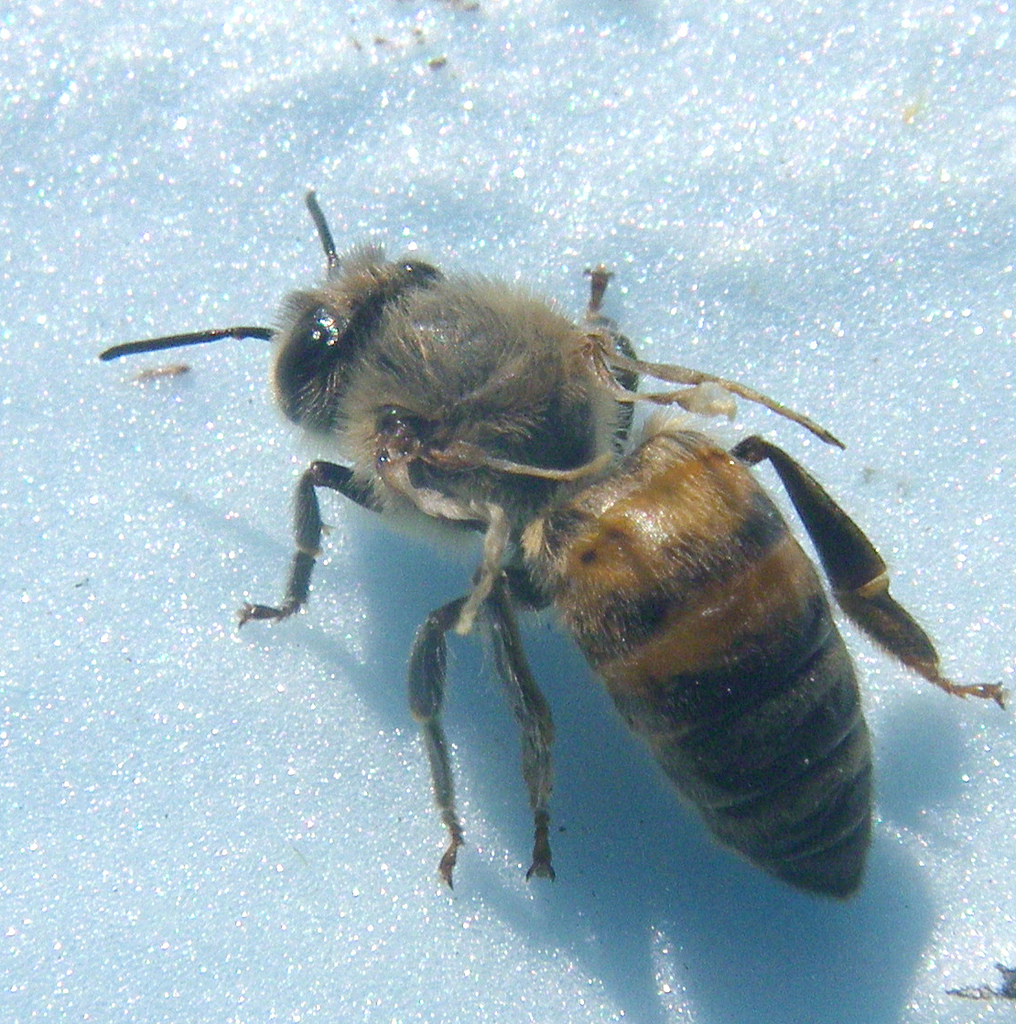
Honey bee infected with deformed wing virus

Arthropods are the largest group of animals and have shown to be a major reservoir of different viruses, both insect-specific viruses (ISV) and viruses that can infect both vertebrates and invertebrates, more known as arthropod-borne viruses (arboviruses). Insect-specific viruses are, as the name reveals, characterised by their incapacity to infect vertebrates. This can be assessed through, viral inoculation of mammalian, avian, or amphibian cell lines. The first (ISV) was discovered over 40 years ago by Stollar and Thomas. It was isolated from an Aedes aegypti cell culture where a large number of syncytia were observed and the virus was named cell fusing agent virus (CFAV). Further, when inoculated on different vertebrate cell lines no cytopathic effect (CPE) could be observed and the virus could not be re-isolated, suggesting that the virus must be insect-specific.

Invertebrates do not produce antibodies by the lymphocyte-based adaptive immune system that is central to vertebrate immunity, but they are capable of effective immune responses. Phagocytosis was first observed in invertebrates, and this and other innate immune responses are important in immunity to viruses and other pathogens. The hemolymph of invertebrates contains many soluble defence molecules, such as hemocyanins, lectins, and proteins, which protect these animals against invaders.

The health of the honey bee has been important to human societies for centuries. Like all invertebrates, the honey bee (Apis mellifera) is susceptible to many viral infections, and their numbers have dramatically declined around the world. These bees often suffer infestations of varroa mites, which are vectors for deformed wing virus, as a result, this virus has become one of the most widely distributed and contagious insect viruses on the planet. The virus causes stunted wings and as a result, the infected bees are unable to leave the hive and forage for nectar. Symptomatic bees have a severely reduced life-span of less than 48 hours and are often expelled from the hive by other bees. Bees are crucial to the survival of humans, along with producing honey, they pollinate plants that contribute up to one third of the food we eat, and their dramatic decline is a grave concern.

Baculoviruses are among the best studied of the invertebrate viruses. They infect and kill several species of agricultural pests, and as natural insecticides, they have been used to control insect populations in Brazil and Paraguay such as the velvet bean caterpillar (Anticarsia gemmatalis), a pest of soy beans. Viruses are an attractive alternative to chemical pesticides because they are safe to other wildlife and leave no residues.

Viruses can also change the behaviour of their insect hosts to their own advantage. A baculovirus of the gypsy moth (Lymantria dispar) makes their caterpillars climb to the tops of trees where they die. In doing so, they release a shower of millions of progeny viruses that go on to infect more caterpillars.

== Bibliography ==
- Leppard, Keith, Nigel Dimmock, Easton, Andrew (2007). Introduction to Modern Virology. Blackwell Publishing Limited. ISBN 978-1-4051-3645-7.
- Mahy B. W.J., Van Regenmortel MHV, eds. (2009). Desk Encyclopedia of General Virology. Oxford: Academic Press. ISBN 978-0-12-375146-1.
- Murphy, FA, Gibbs, EPJ, Horzinek, MC, Studdart MJ (1999). Veterinary Virology. Boston: Academic Press. ISBN 978-0-12-511340-3.
