= Parainfluenza hemagglutinin-neuraminidase =

Type of hemagglutinin-neuraminidase

Hemagglutinin-neuraminidase

Identifiers
- Organism: Human parainfluenza 3 virus (strain Wash/47885/57)
- Symbol: HN
- PDB: 4MZA
- UniProt: P08492
Search for
- Structures: Swiss-model
- Domains: InterPro

Parainfluenza hemagglutinin-neuraminidase is a type of hemagglutinin-neuraminidase produced by parainfluenza.
