= Hemagglutinin-neuraminidase =

Hemagglutinin-neuraminidase, Paramyxoviridae
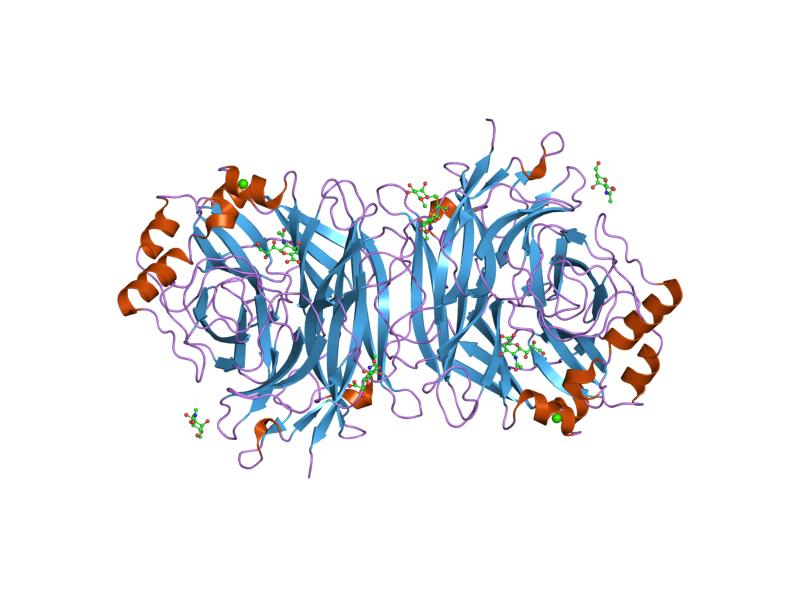
- Structure of the sialic acid binding site in Newcastle disease virus hemagglutinin-neuraminidase.

Identifiers
- Symbol: HN
- Pfam: PF00423
- Pfam clan: CL0434
- InterPro: IPR000665
- SCOP2: 1usr / SCOPe / SUPFAM
- CAZy: GH83
- CDD: cd15469
Available protein structures:
- PDB: 1e8t, 1e8u, 1e8v, 1usr, 1usx, 1v2i, 1v3b, 1v3c, 1v3d, 1v3e IPR000665 PF00423 (ECOD; PDBsum)
- AlphaFold: IPR000665; PF00423

Hemagglutinin-neuraminidase (or haemagglutinin-neuraminidase in British English) (HN) refers to a single viral protein that has both hemagglutinin and (endo) neuraminidase EC 3.2.1.18 activity. This is in contrast to the proteins found in influenza, where both functions exist but in two separate proteins. Its neuraminidase domain has the CAZy designation glycoside hydrolase family 83 (GH83).

It does show a structural similarity to influenza viral neuraminidase and has a six-bladed beta-propeller structure. This Pfam entry also matches measles hemagglutinin (cd15467), which has a "dead" neuraminidase part repurposed as a receptor binding site.

Hemagglutinin-neuraminidase allows the virus to stick to a potential host cell, and cut itself loose if necessary. Hemagglutinin-neuraminidase can be found in a variety of paramyxoviruses including mumps virus, human parainfluenza virus 3, and the avian pathogen Newcastle disease virus.

Types include:

- Mumps hemagglutinin-neuraminidase
- Parainfluenza hemagglutinin-neuraminidase

Hemagglutinin-neuraminidase inhibitors have been investigated and suggest that there may applications for human use in the future.
