= Orthorubulavirus =

Virus classification
- (unranked): Virus
- Realm: Riboviria
- Kingdom: Orthornavirae
- Phylum: Negarnaviricota
- Class: Monjiviricetes
- Order: Mononegavirales
- Family: Paramyxoviridae
- Subfamily: Rubulavirinae
- Genus: Orthorubulavirus

Genus of viruses

Orthorubulavirus is a genus of viruses in the family Paramyxoviridae.

== Species ==
The genus contains the following species:

- Orthorubulavirus hominis
- Orthorubulavirus laryngotracheitidis
- Orthorubulavirus mammalis
- Orthorubulavirus mapueraense
- Orthorubulavirus parotitidis
- Orthorubulavirus rhinolophi
- Orthorubulavirus simiae
- Orthorubulavirus suis
