= Hemagglutination =

Form of agglutination in red blood cells

Hemagglutination, or haemagglutination, is a specific form of agglutination that involves red blood cells (RBCs). It has two common uses in the laboratory: blood typing and the quantification of virus dilutions in a haemagglutination assay.

== Blood typing ==
Blood type can be determined by using antibodies that bind to the A or B blood group antigens in a sample of blood.

For example, if antibodies that bind the A blood group are added and agglutination occurs, the blood is either type A or type AB. To determine between type A or type AB, antibodies that bind the B group are added and if agglutination does not occur, the blood is type A. If agglutination does not occur with either antibodies that bind to type A or type B antigens, then neither antigen is present on the blood cells, which means the blood is type O.

In blood grouping, the patient's serum is tested against RBCs of known blood groups and also the patient's RBCs are tested against known serum types. In this way the patient's blood group is confirmed from both RBCs and serum. A direct Coombs test is also done on the patient's blood sample in case there are any confounding antibodies.

== Viral hemagglutination assay ==
Many viruses attach to molecules present on the surface of RBCs. A consequence of this is that at certain concentrations, a viral suspension may bind together (agglutinate) the RBCs, thus preventing them from settling out of suspension. Since agglutination is not linked to infectivity, attenuated viruses can therefore be used in assays while an additional assay such as a plaque assay must be used to determine infectivity. By serially diluting a virus suspension into an assay tray (a series of wells of uniform volume) and adding a standard amount of blood cells, an estimation of the number of virus particles can be made. While less accurate than a plaque assay, it is cheaper and quicker (taking just 30 minutes).

This assay may be modified to include the addition of an antiserum. By using a standard amount of virus, a standard amount of blood cells, and serially diluting the antiserum, one can identify the concentration of the antiserum (the greatest dilution which inhibits hemagglutination).
