= Virology =

Study of viruses

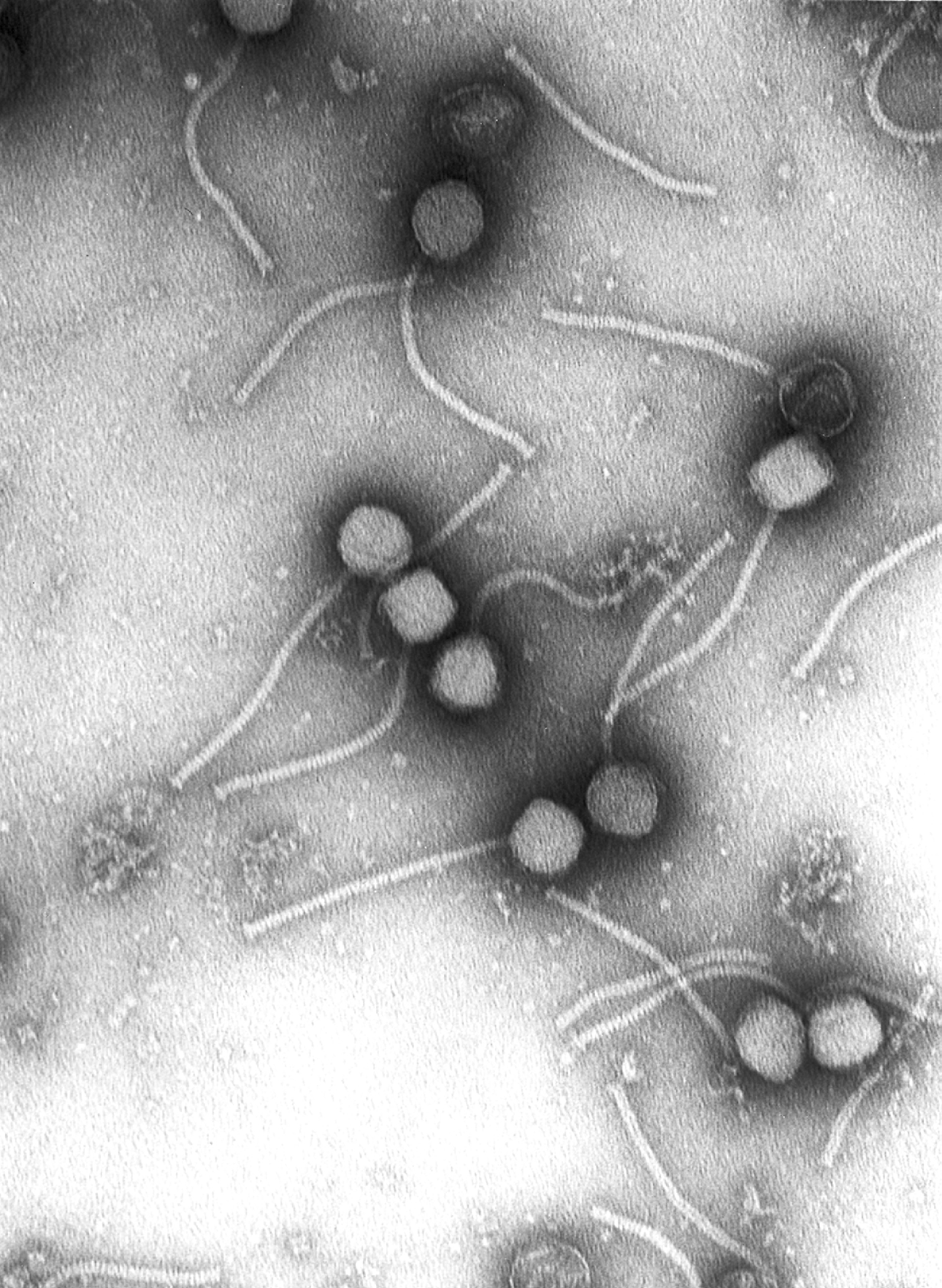
Gamma phage, an example of virus particles (visualised by electron microscopy)

Virology is the scientific study of biological viruses. It is a subfield of microbiology that focuses on their detection, structure, classification and evolution, their methods of infection and exploitation of host cells for reproduction, their interaction with host organism physiology and immunity, the diseases they cause, the techniques to isolate and culture them, and their use in research and therapy.

The identification of the causative agent of tobacco mosaic disease (TMV) as a novel pathogen by Martinus Beijerinck (1898) is now acknowledged as being the official beginning of the field of virology as a discipline distinct from bacteriology. He realized the source was neither a bacterial nor a fungal infection, but something completely different. Beijerinck used the word "virus" to describe the mysterious agent in his 'contagium vivum fluidum' ('contagious living fluid'). Rosalind Franklin proposed the full structure of the tobacco mosaic virus in 1955.

As an applied science, virology forms a significant portion of medical microbiology and medicine. The application of virology in veterinary medicine is called veterinary virology, and the study of plant viruses forms part of plant pathology. Viral pathogenesis is the branch of virology studying how viruses infect and cause diseases to their hosts.

Virology began when there were no methods for propagating or visualizing viruses or specific laboratory tests for viral infections. The methods for separating viral nucleic acids (RNA and DNA) and proteins, which are now the mainstay of virology, did not exist. Now there are many methods for observing the structure and functions of viruses and their component parts. Thousands of different viruses are now known about and virologists often specialize in either the viruses that infect plants, or bacteria and other microorganisms, or animals. Viruses that infect humans are now studied by medical virologists. Virology is a broad subject covering biology, health, animal welfare, agriculture and ecology.

== History ==
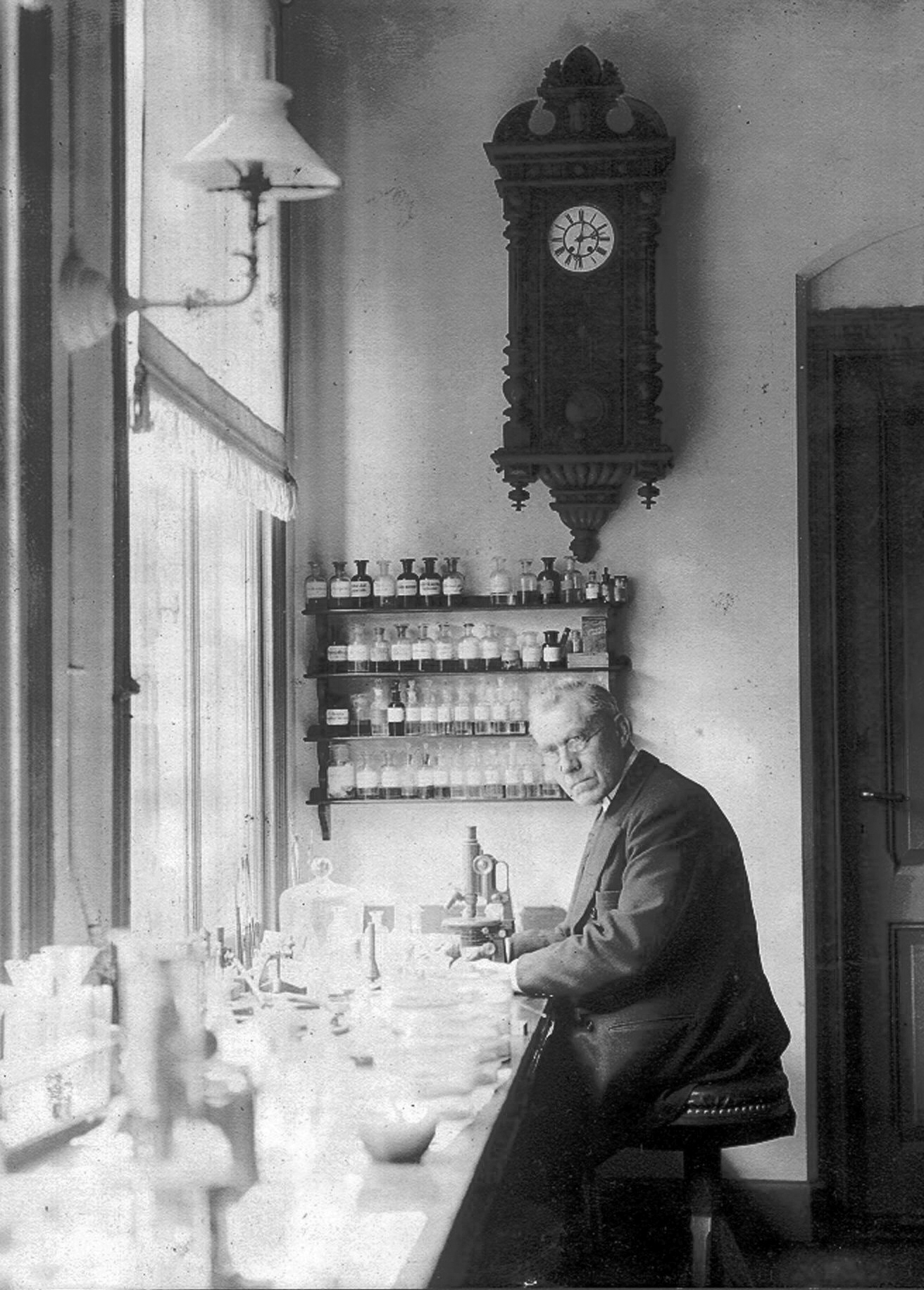
Martinus Beijerinck in his laboratory in 1921

Louis Pasteur was unable to find a causative agent for rabies and speculated about a pathogen too small to be detected by microscopes. In 1884, the French microbiologist Charles Chamberland invented the Chamberland filter (or Pasteur-Chamberland filter) with pores small enough to remove all bacteria from a solution passed through it. In 1892, the Russian biologist Dmitri Ivanovsky used this filter to study what is now known as the tobacco mosaic virus: crushed leaf extracts from infected tobacco plants remained infectious even after filtration to remove bacteria. Ivanovsky suggested the infection might be caused by a toxin produced by bacteria, but he did not pursue the idea. At the time it was thought that all infectious agents could be retained by filters and grown on a nutrient medium—this was part of the germ theory of disease.

In 1898, the Dutch microbiologist Martinus Beijerinck repeated the experiments and became convinced that the filtered solution contained a new form of infectious agent. He observed that the agent multiplied only in cells that were dividing, but as his experiments did not show that it was made of particles, he called it a contagium vivum fluidum (soluble living germ) and reintroduced the word virus. Beijerinck maintained that viruses were liquid in nature, a theory later discredited by Wendell Stanley, who proved they were particulate. In the same year, Friedrich Loeffler and Paul Frosch passed the first animal virus, aphthovirus (the agent of foot-and-mouth disease), through a similar filter.

In the early 20th century, the English bacteriologist Frederick Twort discovered a group of viruses that infect bacteria, now called bacteriophages (or commonly 'phages'), in 1915. The French-Canadian microbiologist Félix d'Herelle announced his independent discovery of bacteriophages in 1917. D'Herelle described viruses that, when added to bacteria on an agar plate, would produce areas of dead bacteria. He accurately diluted a suspension of these viruses and discovered that the highest dilutions (lowest virus concentrations), rather than killing all the bacteria, formed discrete areas of dead organisms. Counting these areas and multiplying by the dilution factor allowed him to calculate the number of viruses in the original suspension. Phages were heralded as a potential treatment for diseases such as typhoid and cholera, but their promise was forgotten with the development of penicillin. The development of bacterial resistance to antibiotics has renewed interest in the therapeutic use of bacteriophages.

By the end of the 19th century, viruses were defined in terms of their infectivity, their ability to pass filters, and their requirement for living hosts. Viruses had been grown only in plants and animals. In 1906 Ross Granville Harrison invented a method for growing tissue in lymph, and in 1913 E. Steinhardt, C. Israeli, and R.A. Lambert used this method to grow vaccinia virus in fragments of guinea pig corneal tissue. In 1928, H. B. Maitland and M. C. Maitland grew vaccinia virus in suspensions of minced hens' kidneys. Their method was not widely adopted until the 1950s when poliovirus was grown on a large scale for vaccine production.

Another breakthrough came in 1931 when the American pathologist Ernest William Goodpasture and Alice Miles Woodruff grew influenza and several other viruses in fertilised chicken eggs. In 1949, John Franklin Enders, Thomas Weller, and Frederick Robbins grew poliovirus in cultured cells from aborted human embryonic tissue, the first virus to be grown without using solid animal tissue or eggs. This work enabled Hilary Koprowski, and then Jonas Salk, to make an effective polio vaccine.

The first images of viruses were obtained upon the invention of electron microscopy in 1931 by the German engineers Ernst Ruska and Max Knoll. In 1935, American biochemist and virologist Wendell Meredith Stanley examined the tobacco mosaic virus and found it was mostly made of protein. A short time later, this virus was separated into protein and RNA parts. The tobacco mosaic virus was the first to be crystallised and its structure could, therefore, be elucidated in detail. The first X-ray diffraction pictures of the crystallised virus were obtained by Bernal and Fankuchen in 1941. Based on her X-ray crystallographic pictures, Rosalind Franklin discovered the full structure of the virus in 1955. In the same year, Heinz Fraenkel-Conrat and Robley Williams showed that purified tobacco mosaic virus RNA and its protein coat can assemble by themselves to form functional viruses, suggesting that this simple mechanism was probably the means through which viruses were created within their host cells.

The second half of the 20th century was the golden age of virus discovery, and most of the documented species of animal, plant, and bacterial viruses were discovered during these years. In 1946, bovine viral diarrhoea (a pestivirus) was first described. In 1957 equine arterivirus was discovered. In 1963 the hepatitis B virus was discovered by Baruch Blumberg. In 1965 Howard Temin described the first retrovirus. Reverse transcriptase, the enzyme that retroviruses use to make DNA copies of their RNA, was first described in 1970 by Temin and David Baltimore independently. In 1983 Luc Montagnier's team at the Pasteur Institute in France, first isolated the retrovirus now called HIV. In 1989 Michael Houghton's team at Chiron Corporation discovered hepatitis C.

== Detecting viruses ==
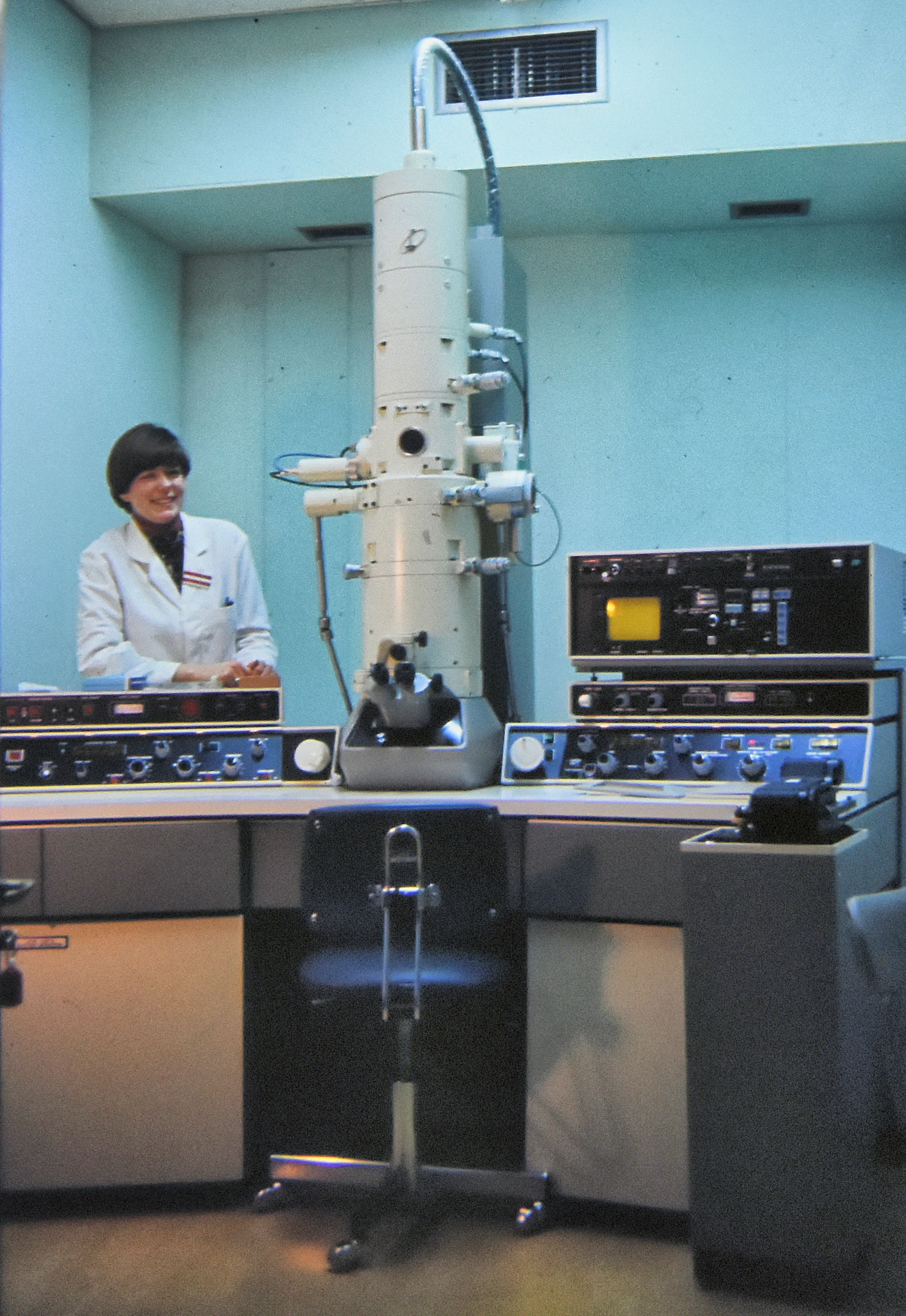
An electron microscope

There are several approaches to detecting viruses; these include the detection of virus particles (virions) or their antigens or nucleic acids and infectivity assays.

=== Electron microscopy ===
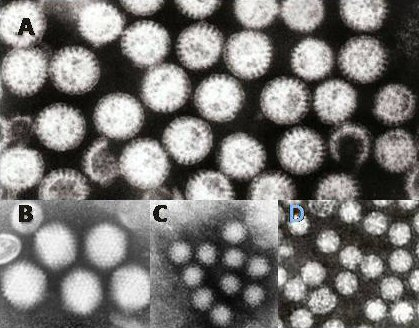
Electron micrographs of viruses. A, rotavirus; B, adenovirus; C, norovirus; and D, astrovirus.

Viruses were seen for the first time in the 1930s when electron microscopes were invented. Unlike optical microscopes that observe with visible light, these microscopes use beams of electrons, which have a much shorter wavelength and can detect objects that cannot be seen using light microscopes. The highest magnification obtainable by electron microscopes is up to 10,000,000 times whereas for light microscopes it is around 1,500 times.

Virologists often use negative staining to help visualise viruses. In this procedure, the viruses are suspended in a solution of metal salts such as uranium acetate. The atoms of metal are opaque to electrons and the viruses are seen as suspended in a dark background of metal atoms. This technique has been in use since the 1950s. Many viruses were discovered using this technique and negative staining electron microscopy is still a valuable weapon in a virologist's arsenal.

Traditional electron microscopy has disadvantages in that viruses are damaged by drying in the high vacuum inside the electron microscope and the electron beam itself is destructive. In cryogenic electron microscopy the structure of viruses is preserved by embedding them in an environment of vitreous water. This allows the determination of biomolecular structures at near-atomic resolution, and has attracted wide attention to the approach as an alternative to X-ray crystallography or NMR spectroscopy for the determination of the structure of viruses.

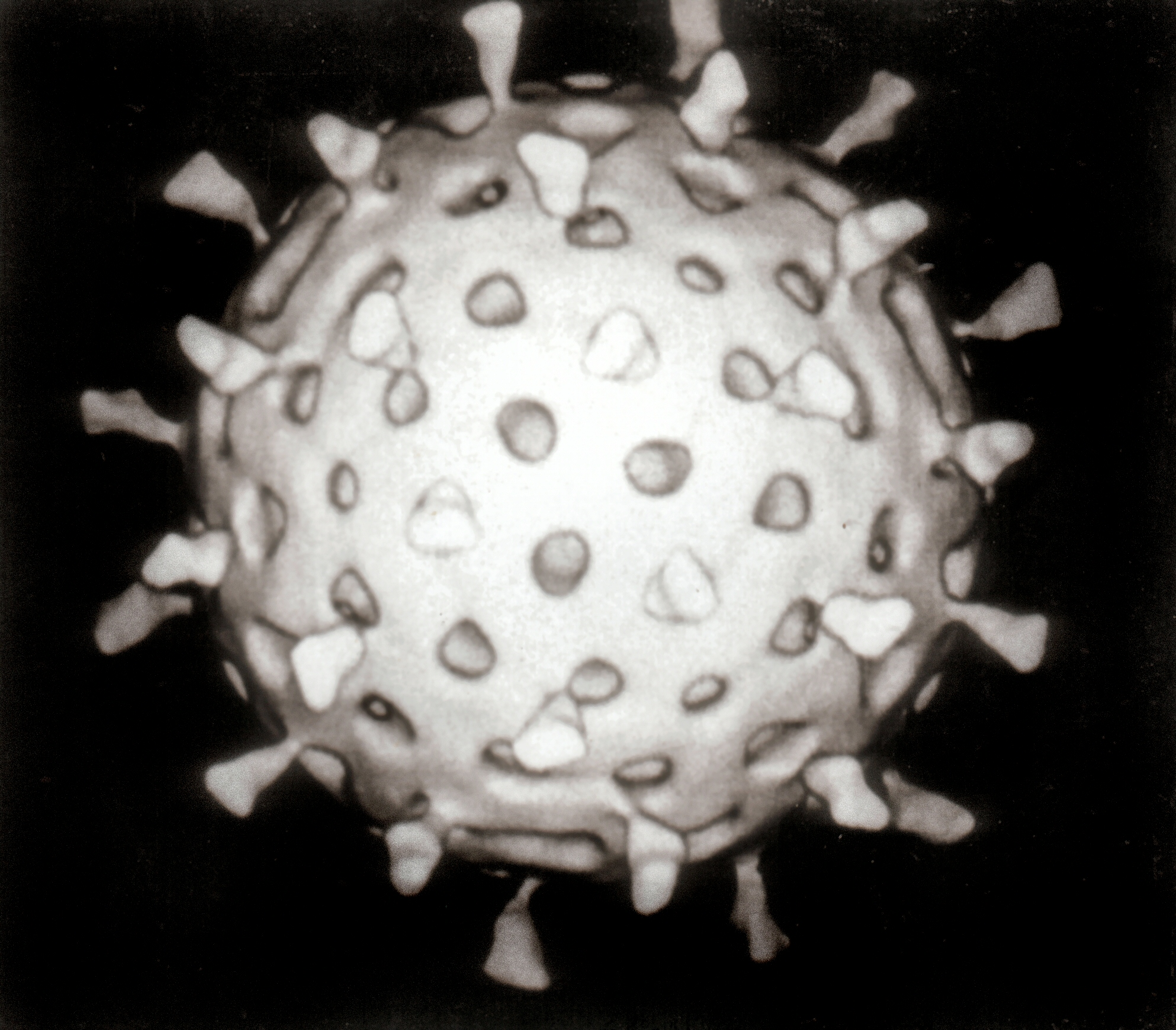
Cryoelectron micrograph of a rotavirus

=== Growth in cultures ===
Viruses are obligate intracellular parasites, and because they only reproduce inside the living cells of a host, these cells are needed to grow them in the laboratory. For viruses that infect animals (usually called "animal viruses") cells grown in laboratory cell cultures are used. In the past, fertile hens' eggs were used and the viruses were grown on the membranes surrounding the embryo. This method is still used in the manufacture of some vaccines. For the viruses that infect bacteria, the bacteriophages, the bacteria growing in test tubes can be used directly. For plant viruses, the natural host plants can be used or, particularly when the infection is not obvious, so-called indicator plants, which show signs of infection more clearly.

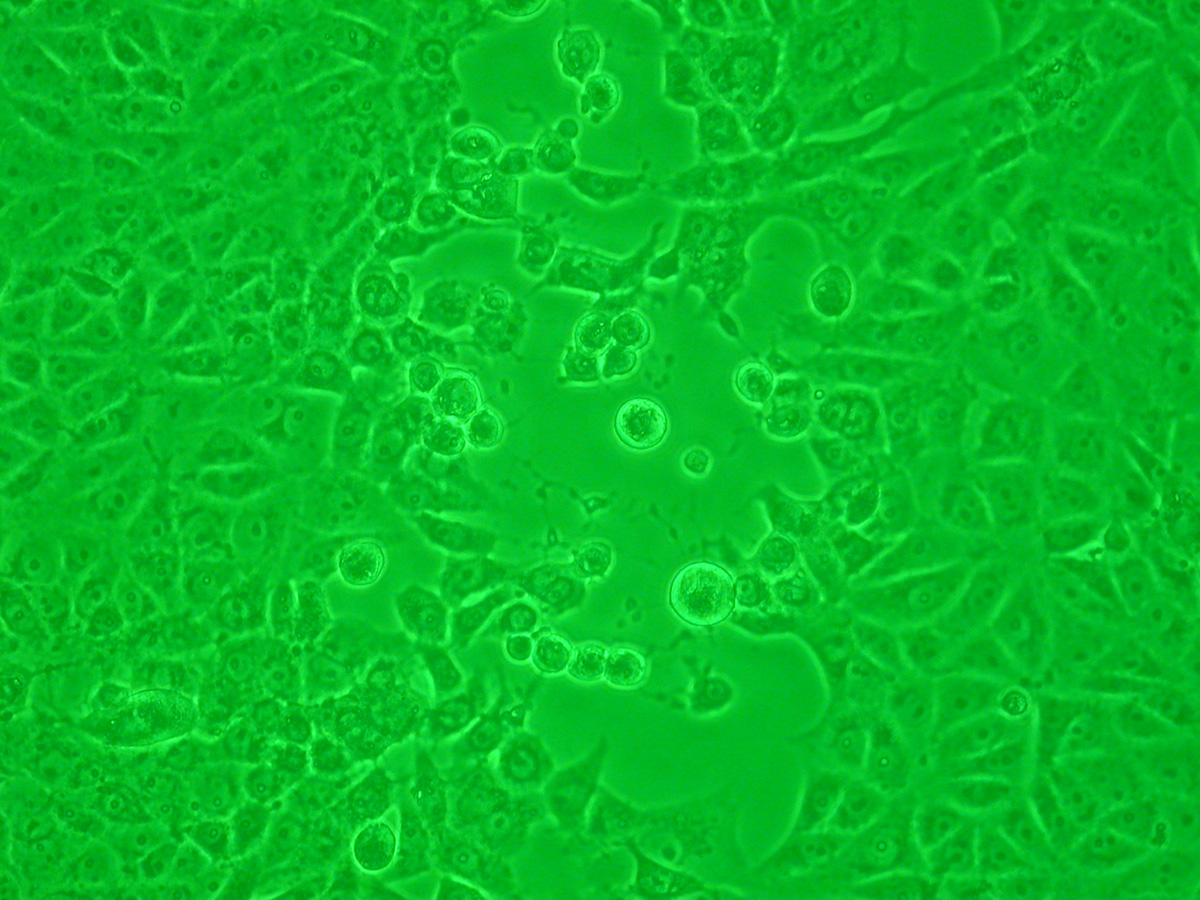
Cytopathic effect of herpes simplex virus. The infected cells have become round and balloon-like.

Viruses that have grown in cell cultures can be indirectly detected by the detrimental effect they have on the host cell. These cytopathic effects are often characteristic of the type of virus. For instance, herpes simplex viruses produce a characteristic "ballooning" of the cells, typically human fibroblasts. Some viruses, such as mumps virus cause red blood cells from chickens to firmly attach to the infected cells. This is called "haemadsorption" or "hemadsorption". Some viruses produce localised "lesions" in cell layers called plaques, which are useful in quantitation assays and in identifying the species of virus by plaque reduction assays.

Viruses growing in cell cultures are used to measure their susceptibility to validated and novel antiviral drugs.

=== Serology ===
Viruses are antigens that induce the production of antibodies. These antibodies can be used in laboratories to study viruses. Related viruses often react with each other's antibodies and some viruses can be named based on the antibodies they react with. The use of the antibodies, which were once exclusively derived from the serum (blood fluid) of animals, is called serology. Once an antibody–reaction has taken place in a test, other methods are needed to confirm this. Older methods included complement fixation tests, hemagglutination inhibition and virus neutralisation. Newer methods use enzyme immunoassays (EIA).

In the years before PCR was invented immunofluorescence was used to quickly confirm viral infections. It is an infectivity assay that is virus species specific because antibodies are used. The antibodies are tagged with a dye that is luminescencent and when using an optical microscope with a modified light source, infected cells glow in the dark.

=== Polymerase chain reaction (PCR) and other nucleic acid detection methods ===
PCR is a mainstay method for detecting viruses in all species including plants and animals. It works by detecting traces of virus specific RNA or DNA. It is very sensitive and specific, but can be easily compromised by contamination. Most of the tests used in veterinary virology and medical virology are based on PCR or similar methods such as transcription mediated amplification. When a novel virus emerges, such as the covid coronavirus, a specific test can be devised quickly so long as the viral genome has been sequenced and unique regions of the viral DNA or RNA identified. The invention of microfluidic tests as allowed for most of these tests to be automated, Despite its specificity and sensitivity, PCR has a disadvantage in that it does not differentiate infectious and non-infectious viruses and "tests of cure" have to be delayed for up to 21 days to allow for residual viral nucleic acid to clear from the site of the infection.

=== Diagnostic tests ===
In laboratories, many of the diagnostic test for detecting viruses are nucleic acid amplification methods such as PCR. Some tests detect the viruses or their components as these include electron microscopy and enzyme-immunoassays. The so-called "home" or "self"-testing gadgets are usually lateral flow tests, which detect the virus using a tagged monoclonal antibody. These are also used in agriculture, food and environmental sciences.

== Quantitation and viral loads ==
Counting viruses (quantitation) has always had an important role in virology and has become central to the control of some infections of humans where the viral load is measured. There are two basic methods: those that count the fully infective virus particles, which are called infectivity assays, and those that count all the particles including the defective ones.

=== Infectivity assays ===
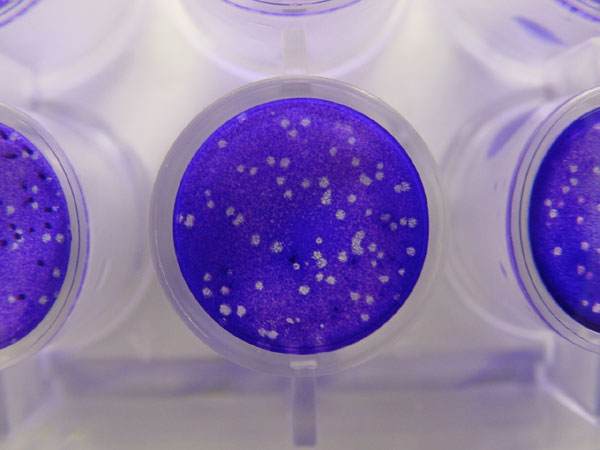
Plaques in cells caused herpes simplex virus. The cells have been fixed and stained blue.

Infectivity assays measure the amount (concentration) of infective viruses in a sample of known volume. For host cells, plants or cultures of bacterial or animal cells are used. Laboratory animals such as mice have also been used particularly in veterinary virology. These are assays are either quantitative where the results are on a continuous scale or quantal, where an event either occurs or it does not. Quantitative assays give absolute values and quantal assays give a statistical probability such as the volume of the test sample needed to ensure 50% of the hosts cells, plants or animals are infected. This is called the median infectious dose or ID _{50}. Infective bacteriophages can be counted by seeding them onto "lawns" of bacteria in culture dishes. When at low concentrations, the viruses form holes in the lawn that can be counted. The number of viruses is then expressed as plaque forming units. For the bacteriophages that reproduce in bacteria that cannot be grown in cultures, viral load assays are used.

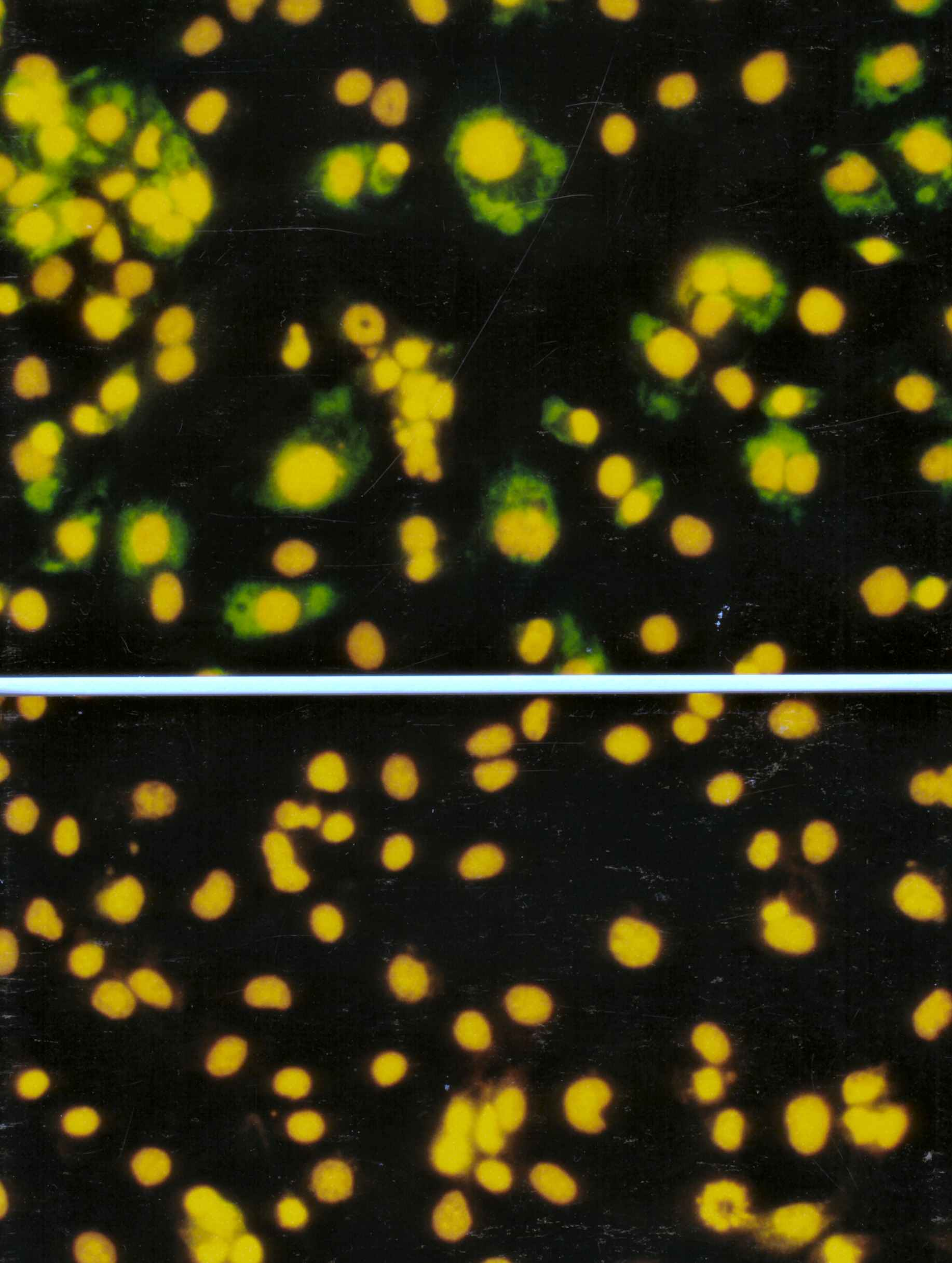
Immunoflourescence: Cells infected by rotavirus (top) and uninfected cells (bottom)

The focus forming assay (FFA) is a variation of the plaque assay, but instead of relying on cell lysis in order to detect plaque formation, the FFA employs immunostaining techniques using fluorescently labeled antibodies specific for a viral antigen to detect infected host cells and infectious virus particles before an actual plaque is formed. The FFA is particularly useful for quantifying classes of viruses that do not lyse the cell membranes, as these viruses would not be amenable to the plaque assay. Like the plaque assay, host cell monolayers are infected with various dilutions of the virus sample and allowed to incubate for a relatively brief incubation period (e.g., 24–72 hours) under a semisolid overlay medium that restricts the spread of infectious virus, creating localized clusters (foci) of infected cells. Plates are subsequently probed with fluorescently labeled antibodies against a viral antigen, and fluorescence microscopy is used to count and quantify the number of foci. The FFA method typically yields results in less time than plaque or fifty-percent-tissue-culture-infective-dose (TCID_{50}) assays, but it can be more expensive in terms of required reagents and equipment. Assay completion time is also dependent on the size of area that the user is counting. A larger area will require more time but can provide a more accurate representation of the sample. Results of the FFA are expressed as focus forming units per milliliter, or FFU/mL.

=== Viral load assays ===
When an assay for measuring the infective virus particle is done (Plaque assay, Focus assay), viral titre often refers to the concentration of infectious viral particles, which is different from the total viral particles. Viral load assays usually count the number of viral genomes present rather than the number of particles and use methods similar to PCR. Viral load tests are an important in the control of infections by HIV. This versatile method can be used for plant viruses.

== Molecular biology ==
Molecular virology is the study of viruses at the level of nucleic acids and proteins. The methods invented by molecular biologists have all proven useful in virology. Their small sizes and relatively simple structures make viruses an ideal candidate for study by these techniques.

=== Purifying viruses and their components ===
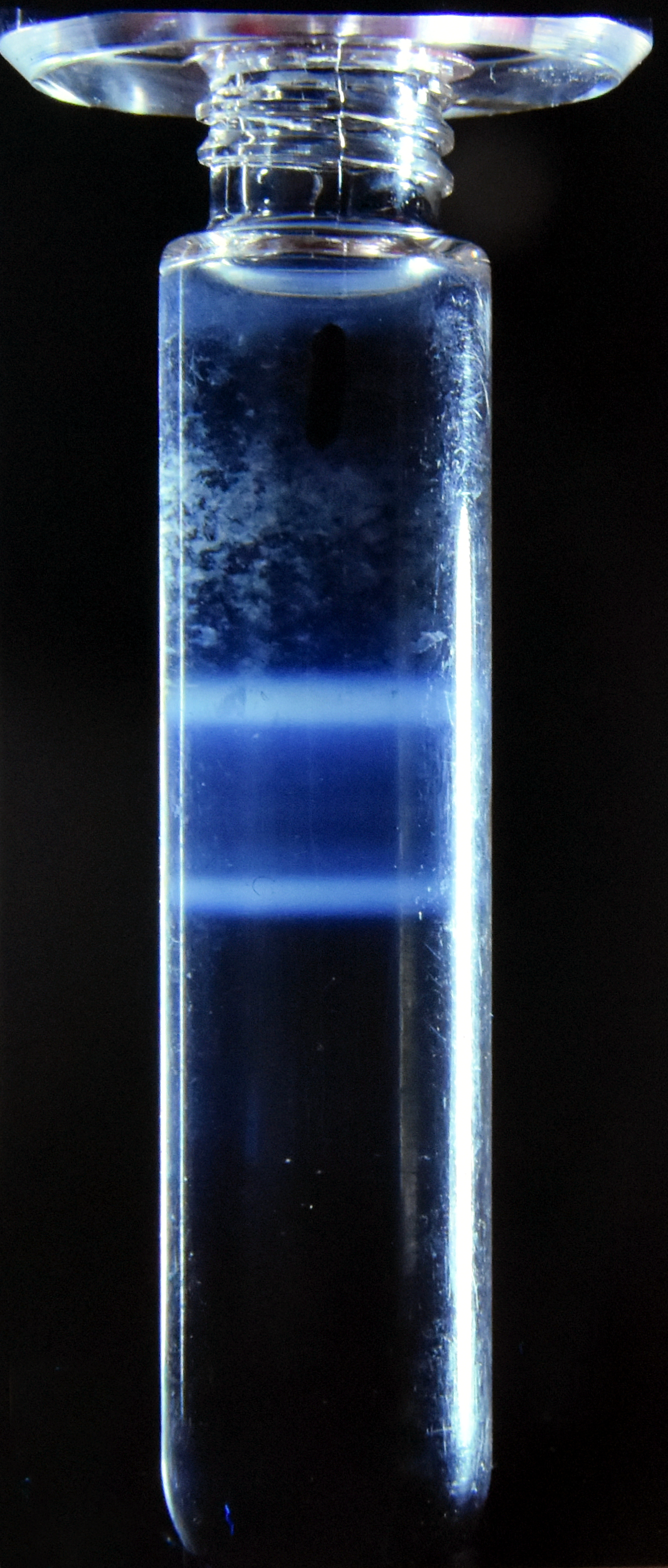
Caesium chloride (CsCl) solution and two morphological types of rotavirus. Following centrifugation at 100,000 g a density gradient forms in the CsCl solution and the virus particles separate according to their densities. The tube is 10 cm tall. The viruses are the two "milky" zones close together.

For further study, viruses grown in the laboratory need purifying to remove contaminants from the host cells. The methods used often have the advantage of concentrating the viruses, which makes it easier to investigate them.

==== Centrifugation ====
Centrifuges are often used to purify viruses. Low speed centrifuges, i.e. those with a top speed of 10,000 revolutions per minute (rpm) are not powerful enough to concentrate viruses, but ultracentrifuges with a top speed of around 100,000 rpm, are and this difference is used in a method called differential centrifugation. In this method the larger and heavier contaminants are removed from a virus mixture by low speed centrifugation. The viruses, which are small and light and are left in suspension, are then concentrated by high speed centrifugation.

Following differential centrifugation, virus suspensions often remain contaminated with debris that has the same sedimentation coefficient and are not removed by the procedure. In these cases a modification of centrifugation, called buoyant density centrifugation, is used. In this method the viruses recovered from differential centrifugation are centrifuged again at very high speed for several hours in dense solutions of sugars or salts that form a density gradient, from low to high, in the tube during the centrifugation. In some cases, preformed gradients are used where solutions of steadily decreasing density are carefully overlaid on each other. Like an object in the Dead Sea, despite the centrifugal force the virus particles cannot sink into solutions that are more dense than they are and they form discrete layers of, often visible, concentrated viruses in the tube. Caesium chloride is often used for these solutions as it is relatively inert but easily self-forms a gradient when centrifuged at high speed in an ultracentrifuge. Buoyant density centrifugation can also be used to purify the components of viruses such as their nucleic acids or proteins.

==== Electrophoresis ====
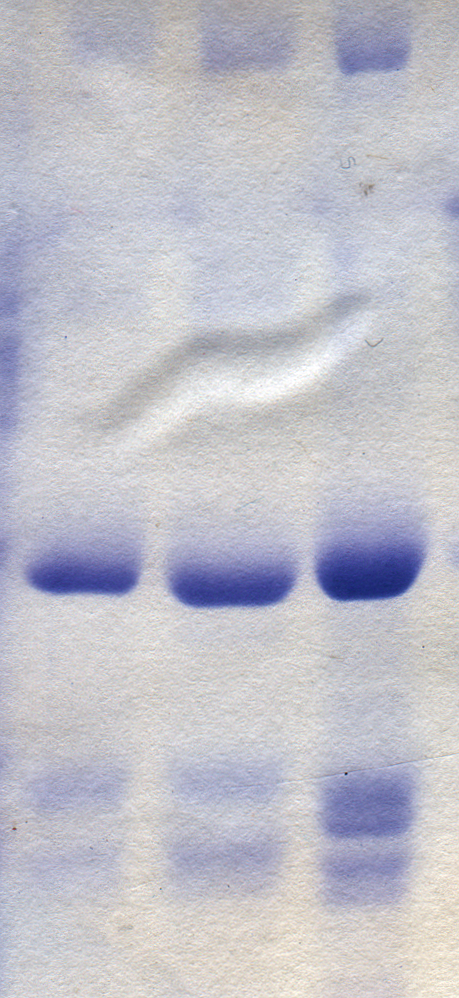
Polyacrylamide gel electrophoresis of rotavirus proteins stained with Coomassie blue

The separation of molecules based on their electric charge is called electrophoresis. Viruses and all their components can be separated and purified using this method. This is usually done in a supporting medium such as agarose and polyacrylamide gels. The separated molecules are revealed using stains such as coomasie blue, for proteins, or ethidium bromide for nucleic acids. In some instances the viral components are rendered radioactive before electrophoresis and are revealed using photographic film in a process known as autoradiography.

=== Sequencing of viral genomes ===
As most viruses are too small to be seen by a light microscope, sequencing is one of the main tools in virology to identify and study the virus. Traditional Sanger sequencing and next-generation sequencing (NGS) are used to sequence viruses in basic and clinical research, as well as for the diagnosis of emerging viral infections, molecular epidemiology of viral pathogens, and drug-resistance testing. There are more than 2.3 million unique viral sequences in GenBank. NGS has surpassed traditional Sanger as the most popular approach for generating viral genomes. Viral genome sequencing as become a central method in viral epidemiology and viral classification.

=== Phylogenetic analysis ===
Data from the sequencing of viral genomes can be used to determine evolutionary relationships and this is called phylogenetic analysis. Software, such as PHYLIP, is used to draw phylogenetic trees. This analysis is also used in studying the spread of viral infections in communities (epidemiology).

=== Cloning ===
When purified viruses or viral components are needed for diagnostic tests or vaccines, cloning can be used instead of growing the viruses. At the start of the COVID-19 pandemic the availability of the severe acute respiratory syndrome coronavirus 2 RNA sequence enabled tests to be manufactured quickly. There are several proven methods for cloning viruses and their components. Small pieces of DNA called cloning vectors are often used and the most common ones are laboratory modified plasmids (small circular molecules of DNA produced by bacteria). The viral nucleic acid, or a part of it, is inserted in the plasmid, which is the copied many times over by bacteria. This recombinant DNA can then be used to produce viral components without the need for native viruses.

=== Phage virology ===
The viruses that reproduce in bacteria, archaea and fungi are informally called "phages", and the ones that infect bacteria – bacteriophages are useful in virology and biology. Bacteriophages were some of the first viruses to be discovered, early in the twentieth century, and because they are relatively easy to grow quickly in laboratories, much of understanding of viruses was originated by studying them. Bacteriophages are used in phage display techniques for screening proteins DNA sequences, a powerful tool in molecular biology.

== Genetics ==
All viruses have genes which are studied using genetics. All the techniques used in molecular biology, such as cloning, creating mutations RNA silencing are used in viral genetics.

=== Reassortment ===
Reassortment is the switching of genes from different parents and it is particularly useful when studying the genetics of viruses that have segmented genomes (fragmented into two or more nucleic acid molecules) such as influenza viruses and rotaviruses. The genes that encode properties such as serotype can be identified in this way.

=== Recombination ===
Often confused with reassortment, recombination is also the mixing of genes but the mechanism differs in that stretches of DNA or RNA molecules, as opposed to the full molecules, are joined during the RNA or DNA replication cycle. Recombination is not as common as reassortment in nature but it is a powerful tool in laboratories for studying the structure and functions of viral genes.

=== Reverse genetics ===
Reverse genetics is a powerful research method in virology. In this procedure complementary DNA (cDNA) copies of virus genomes called "infectious clones" are used to produce genetically modified viruses that can be then tested for changes in say, virulence or transmissibility.

== Virus classification ==
A major branch of virology is virus classification. It is artificial in that it is not based on evolutionary phylogenetics but it is based on shared or distinguishing properties of viruses. It seeks to describe the diversity of viruses by naming and grouping them on the basis of similarities. In 1962, André Lwoff, Robert Horne, and Paul Tournier were the first to develop a means of virus classification, based on the Linnaean hierarchical system. This system based classification on phylum, class, order, family, genus, and species. Viruses were grouped according to their shared properties (not those of their hosts) and the type of nucleic acid forming their genomes. In 1966, the International Committee on Taxonomy of Viruses (ICTV) was formed. The system proposed by Lwoff, Horne and Tournier was initially not accepted by the ICTV because the small genome size of viruses and their high rate of mutation made it difficult to determine their ancestry beyond order. As such, the Baltimore classification system has come to be used to supplement the more traditional hierarchy. Starting in 2018, the ICTV began to acknowledge deeper evolutionary relationships between viruses that have been discovered over time and adopted a 15-rank classification system ranging from realm to species. Additionally, some species within the same genus are grouped into a genogroup.

=== ICTV classification ===
The ICTV developed the current classification system and wrote guidelines that put a greater weight on certain virus properties to maintain family uniformity. A unified taxonomy (a universal system for classifying viruses) has been established. Only a small part of the total diversity of viruses has been studied. As of 2021, 6 realms, 10 kingdoms, 17 phyla, 2 subphyla, 39 classes, 65 orders, 8 suborders, 233 families, 168 subfamilies, 2,606 genera, 84 subgenera, and 10,434 species of viruses have been defined by the ICTV.

The general taxonomic structure of taxon ranges and the suffixes used in taxonomic names are shown hereafter. As of 2021, the ranks of subrealm, subkingdom, and subclass are unused, whereas all other ranks are in use.

Realm (-viria)

Subrealm (-vira)

Kingdom (-virae)

Subkingdom (-virites)

Phylum (-viricota)

Subphylum (-viricotina)

Class (-viricetes)

Subclass (-viricetidae)

Order (-virales)

Suborder (-virineae)

Family (-viridae)

Subfamily (-virinae)

Genus (-virus)

Subgenus (-virus)

Species

=== Baltimore classification ===
The Baltimore Classification of viruses is based on the method of viral mRNA synthesis.

The Nobel Prize-winning biologist David Baltimore devised the Baltimore classification system.

The Baltimore classification of viruses is based on the mechanism of mRNA production. Viruses must generate mRNAs from their genomes to produce proteins and replicate themselves, but different mechanisms are used to achieve this in each virus family. Viral genomes may be single-stranded (ss) or double-stranded (ds), RNA or DNA, and may or may not use reverse transcriptase (RT). In addition, ssRNA viruses may be either sense (+) or antisense (−). This classification places viruses into seven groups:

- I: dsDNA viruses (e.g. Adenoviruses, Herpesviruses, Poxviruses)
- II: ssDNA viruses (+ strand or "sense") DNA (e.g. Parvoviruses)
- III: dsRNA viruses (e.g. Reoviruses)
- IV: (+)ssRNA viruses (+ strand or sense) RNA (e.g. Coronaviruses, Picornaviruses, Togaviruses)
- V: (−)ssRNA viruses (− strand or antisense) RNA (e.g. Orthomyxoviruses, Rhabdoviruses)
- VI: ssRNA-RT viruses (+ strand or sense) RNA with DNA intermediate in life-cycle (e.g. Retroviruses)
- VII: dsDNA-RT viruses DNA with RNA intermediate in life-cycle (e.g. Hepadnaviruses)
