= Adolf Mayer =

German agronomist (1843–1942)

Adolf Eduard Mayer
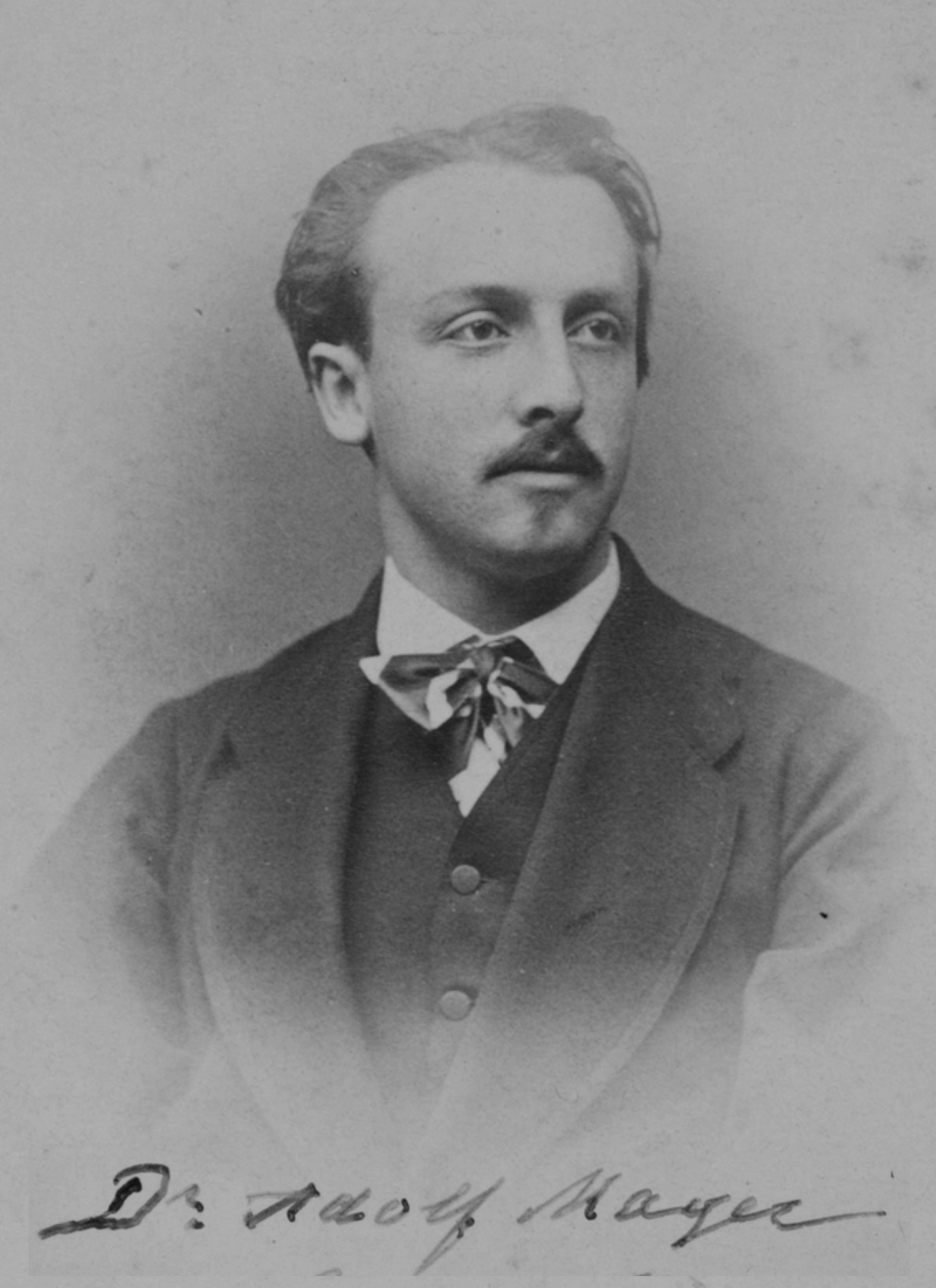
- Adolf Mayer in 1875
- Born: 9 August 1843; Oldenburg, Germany
- Died: 25 December 1942 (aged 99); Heidelberg, Germany
- Education: Karlsruhe Institute of Technology; Heidelberg University
- Known for: Tobacco mosaic virus
- Scientific career
- Fields: Botany, Virology
- Workplaces: University of Halle-Wittenberg; Heidelberg University; Wageningen University and Research Centre

Adolf Eduard Mayer (9 August 1843 – 25 December 1942) was a German agricultural biologist whose work on tobacco mosaic disease played an important role in the discovery of tobacco mosaic virus and viruses in general.

Mayer was born in 1843 into the family of a high school teacher in Oldenburg. His mother was a daughter of renowned German chemist Leopold Gmelin. From 1860 to 1862 he studied biology, geology and chemistry at the Karlsruhe Institute of Technology. In 1862 he enrolled at the University of Heidelberg, where in 1864 he graduated summa cum laude with a Ph.D. in biology.

In 1879, while Mayer held the position of the director of the Agricultural Experiment Station at Wageningen in the Netherlands, he was asked by Dutch farmers to study a peculiar disease affecting the tobacco plant. Mayer published a paper in 1886 on the disease, which he named "mosaic disease of tobacco", and described its symptoms in detail. He demonstrated that the disease can be transmitted by using the sap from the affected tobacco plants as the inoculum to infect healthy plants. At the time, this disease was thought to be spread by very small bacteria or toxins, yet some years later the tobacco mosaic virus (TMV) was shown to be the culprit. Mayer employed optical microscopy to seek signs of fungi or bacteria in the infected sap, yet he did not find any, since the TMV is too small to be detected in an optical microscope. Mayer still concluded that the infectious agent was some sort of bacteria and incorrectly claimed that he was able to obtain "clear filtrate" from the infected sap using filter paper in several repetitions. Filtration experiments with paper and finest porcelain Chamberland filters were replicated by Dmitry Ivanovsky in 1892 and Martinus Beijerinck in 1898, who showed that the infectious agent of the tobacco mosaic disease was in fact infilterable. Martinus Beijerinck coined the term of "virus" to indicate a non-bacterial nature of the tobacco mosaic disease. In 1935, the tobacco mosaic virus was the first virus to be crystallized. Despite the erroneous conclusion, Mayer's pioneer work on the tobacco mosaic disease served as an important step in the discovery of viruses and led to the foundation of the field of virology.
