= Auxanography =

Microbiology technique

Auxanography is the study of the effects of changes in environment on the growth of microorganisms, by means of auxanograms. It was first devised by Beijerinck for testing the effect of various nutrient media upon bacteria.

The bacteria are plated out in a medium known to be poorly adapted for their nourishment, and then drops of the tested solutions are added to the surface of the plate. If the requisite nutrient has been added, the bacteria will develop rapidly in these spots.

== See also ==
- Enrichment culture – medium that favors the growth of a microorganism.
- Eutrophication
