= D50 =

D50, D-50 or D 50 may refer to:

- Chrysler D-50, a compact pickup truck marketed by Chrysler in Australia and based on the Mitsubishi Triton
  - Dodge D50, a similar compact pickup truck marketed by Chrysler in the United States
- D50, a CIE Standard Illuminant, a lighting standard used in colorimetry and also in graphic design as a white point
- D50, an intravenous sugar solution of 50% dextrose
- D50, the ICD-10 code for iron deficiency anemia
- D50, the mass-median-diameter in particle-size distribution measurements, considered to be the average particle size by mass
- D50 (film), working title for a Tamil-language film
- D50 (radiotherapy), the half maximal inhibitory dose, representing the dose of light or ionising radiation that is required for 50% inactivation of a tumor cell population
- D50 road (Croatia), a state route
- JNR Class D50, a Japanese steam locomotive class
- Lancia D50, a Formula One racing car driven by Juan Manuel Fangio to win the 1956 World Driver's Championship
- New South Wales D50 class locomotive, an Australian steam locomotive class
- Nikon D50, an entry-level digital SLR camera
- Roland D-50, a digital synthesizer
