= Enrichment culture =

Altering a microbiological sample to favor the growth of some microorganism

In microbiology, enrichment culture is the use of certain growth media to favor the growth of a particular microorganism over others, enriching a sample for the microorganism of interest. This is generally done by introducing nutrients or environmental conditions that only allow the growth of an organism of interest. Enrichment cultures are used to increase a small number of desired organisms to detectable levels. This allows for the detection and identification of microorganisms with a variety of nutritional needs. Enrichment cultures are often used for soil and fecal samples.

== History ==
The microbiologist (and botanist) Martinus Beijerinck is credited with developing the first enrichment cultures. Sergei Winogradsky also experimented on bacteria using different cultures.

== Examples ==
Media with a high salt concentration will select for halophiles.

Selenite broth is used to selectively isolate Salmonella species. Alkaline Peptone Water is used for the cultivation of vibrio. Both these examples are clinically relevant for clinical microbiology relating to stool samples.

== See also ==
- Microbiological culture
- Auxanography
- Enriched medium
