= Minimal infective dose =

The concept of a minimal infective dose (MID), also known as the infectious dose, has traditionally been used for infectious microorganisms that contaminate foods. MID was defined as the number of microorganisms ingested (the dose) from which a pathology is observed in the consumer. For example, to cause gastrointestinal disorders, the food must contain more than 100,000 Salmonella per gram or 1000 per gram for salmonellosis. However, some viruses like DHBV( duck hepatitis B virus) can cause infections with a single viral particle. To know the dose ingested, it is also necessary to know the mass of the portion. This may be calculated using the following formula:

$$\ce{d\ =\ c \times m}$$

where:

- $\ce{d}$ = number of bacteria i.e. dose
- $\ce{c}$ = concentration of bacteria
- $\ce{m}$ = mass

This formulation has served as a basis for reasoning to establish the maximum concentrations permitted by the microbiological regulatory criteria intended to protect the health of consumers.

== Dose–effect and dose–response relationship ==
The concept of a dose–response relationship dates back to as 1493 but its modern usage reaches to the 20th century, as quantitative risk assessment matured as a discipline within the field of food safety.

An infectious bacterium in a food can cause various effects, such as diarrhea, vomiting, sepsis, meningitis, Guillain–Barré syndrome, and death. Most of the times, as the dose increases, the severity of the pathological effects increases, and a "dose–effect relationship" can often be established. For example, the higher the dose of Salmonella, the more diarrhea occurs soon after ingestion until it reaches to its maximum.

However, among people who have ingested the same dose, not all are affected. The proportion of people affected is called the response. The dose–response relationship for a given effect (e.g., diarrhea) is therefore the relationship between the dose and the likelihood of experiencing this effect. When the response is less than about 10%, it is observed that there is a strictly proportional relationship between dose and response:

$$\ce{P \propto r \times d}$$

where:

- $\ce{P}$ = probability of the effect considered
- $\ce{r}$ = response
- $\ce{d}$ = dosage

The dose-effect relationship and the dose-response relationship should not be confused.

=== Consequences ===
The existence of this relation has a first important consequence: the proportionality factor, symbolized by the letter r, corresponds precisely to the probability of the effect considered when the dose is equal to one bacterial cell. As a result, the minimum infective dose is exactly equal to one bacterial cell, deviating from the traditional notion of the MID. Proportionality has a second consequence: when the dose is divided by ten, the probability of observing the effect is also divided by ten.

Additionally, it is a relationship without threshold. In industrial practice, everything is done to reduce the probability that a serving contains the bacterium. There is therefore on the market food in which, for example, only one serving in a hundred is contaminated. The probability of the effect considered is then r / 100. If one in ten thousand is contaminated, the probability goes to r / 10,000, and so on. The line representing the relation can be extended towards zero: there is no threshold.

If the probability of not being infected when exposed to one bacterium is $1-r$ then the probability of not being infected by n bacteria would be $(1-r)^n\approx\exp(-nr),$ so the probability of being infected is $1-\exp(-nr).$ For readers familiar with the notion of D50 (the dose that causes the effect in 50% of consumers exposed to the hazard), in most cases the following relationship thus applies:

$$D_{50} = \frac{-\text{ln}(0.50)}{r} \approx \frac{0.69}{r}$$

=== Comparisons ===
To compare the dose–response relationships for different effects caused by the same bacterium, or for the same effect caused by different bacteria, one can directly compare the values of r; also, it can be used to evaluate the efficacy of a drugs such as antibiotics. However, it may be easier to compare the doses causing the effect in 50% or 1% of consumers. These are values of D1 (dose causing the effect considered in 1% of consumers exposed to the hazard):

- Escherichia coli (EHEC), haemolytic-uremic syndrome in children under 6 years: 8.4 bacterial cells;
- Escherichia coli (EHEC), haemolytic-uraemic syndrome in children aged 6 to 14 years: 41.9 bacterial cells;
- Listeria monocytogenes, severe listeriosis in the general population: 4.2×10^{11} bacterial cells;
- Listeria monocytogenes, severe listeriosis in the susceptible population: 9.5×10^{9} bacterial cells.

These examples highlight two important things:

1. D1 and r depend not only on the bacterium and the effect considered, but also on the belonging to categories of consumers susceptible to the disease; therefore, there are as many dose-response curves as there are pathogens, health effects and sensitivities of exposed individuals;
2. For the bacteria of the examples above, the orders of magnitude of the values of D1 are profoundly different. The hygiene practices and control measures that food chain businesses must implement against these bacteria are therefore not comparable.

=== Risk management ===
While consuming a low dose of pathogenic bacterium is associated with a low probability of disease, infection is still possible. This contributes to sporadic cases of food-borne illness in the population. There is no bacterial concentration in food below which a lack of epidemic is guaranteed.

=== Toxigenic bacteria ===
Some food-borne bacteria can cause disease by producing toxins, rather than infection like ETEC. Some synthesize a toxin only when their concentration in the food before ingestion exceeds a threshold, such as Staphylococcus aureus and Bacillus cereus. The concept of MID does not apply to them, but there is a concentration below which they do not constitute a danger to the health of the consumer.

== See also ==
- Viral load
- Plaque forming unit
- Virus quantification
