= Martinus Beijerinck =

Dutch microbiologist (1851–1931)

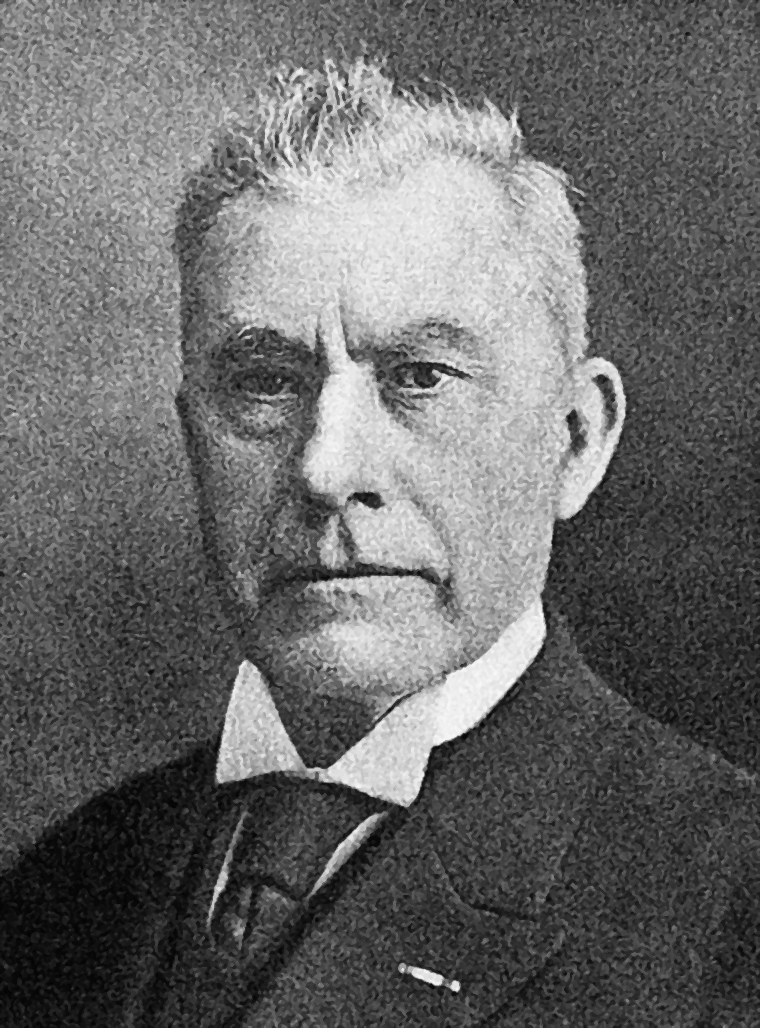
- Born: Martinus Willem Beijerinck; 16 March 1851; Amsterdam, Netherlands
- Died: 1 January 1931 (aged 79); Gorssel, Netherlands
- Education: Leiden University
- Known for: One of the founders of virology, environmental microbiology and general microbiology Conceptual discovery of virus (tobacco mosaic virus); Enrichment culture Biological nitrogen fixation Sulfate-reducing bacteria Nitrogen fixing bacteria Azotobacter (Azotobacter chroococcum); Rhizobium; Desulfovibrio desulfuricans (Spirillum desulfuricans)
- Awards: Leeuwenhoek Medal (1905)
- Scientific career
- Fields: Microbiology
- Workplaces: Wageningen University; Delft School of Microbiology (founder)

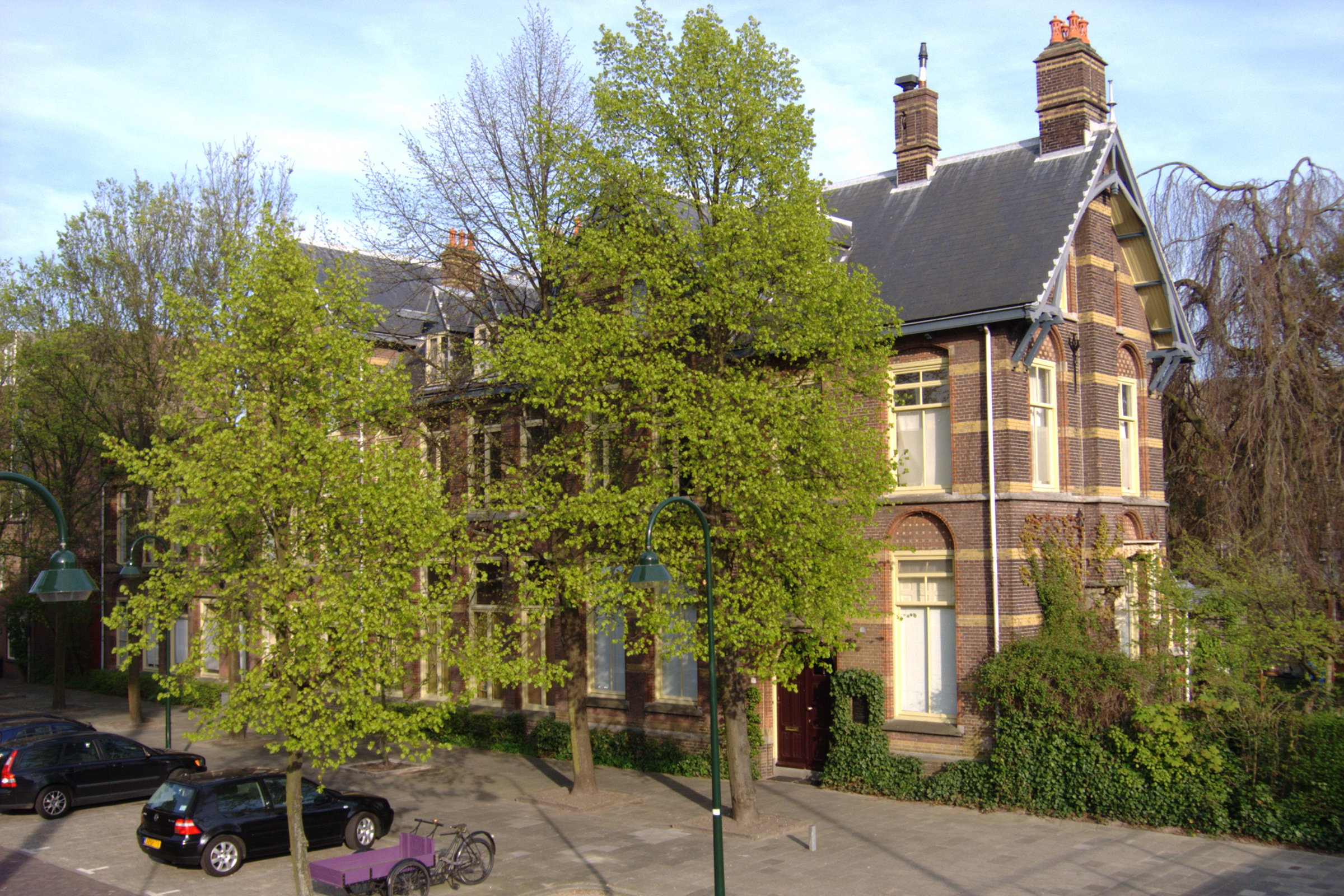
The Laboratory of Microbiology in Delft, where Beijerinck worked from 1897 to 1921.

Martinus Willem Beijerinck (Dutch pronunciation: [mɑrˈtinʏs ˈʋɪləm ˈbɛiərɪŋk], 16 March 1851 – 1 January 1931) was a Dutch microbiologist and botanist who was one of the founders of virology and environmental microbiology. He is credited with the co-discovery of viruses (1898), which he called "contagium vivum fluidum".

== Life ==
=== Early life and education ===
Born in Amsterdam, Beijerinck studied at the Technical School of Delft, where he was awarded the degree of biology in 1872. He obtained his Doctor of Science degree from the University of Leiden in 1877.

At the time, Delft, then a Polytechnic, did not have the right to confer doctorates, so Leiden did this for them. He became a teacher in microbiology at the Agricultural School in Wageningen (now Wageningen University) and later at the Polytechnische Hogeschool Delft (Delft Polytechnic, currently Delft University of Technology) (from 1895). He established the Delft School of Microbiology. His studies of agricultural and industrial microbiology yielded fundamental discoveries in the field of biology. His achievements have been perhaps unfairly overshadowed by those of his contemporaries, Robert Koch and Louis Pasteur, because unlike them, Beijerinck never actually studied human disease.

In 1877, he wrote his first notable research paper, discussing plant galls. The paper later became the basis for his doctoral dissertation.

In 1885 he became a member of the Royal Netherlands Academy of Arts and Sciences.

=== Scientific career ===
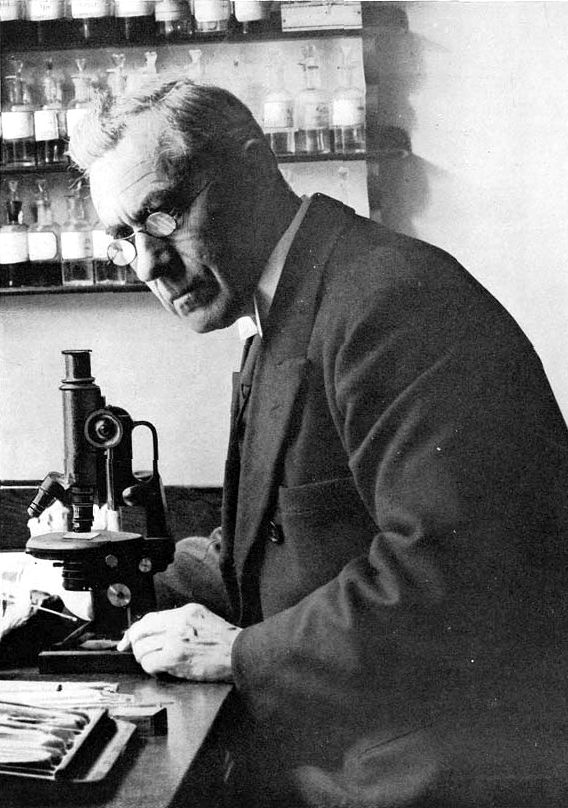
Beijerinck working in his laboratory

Beijerinck is considered one of the founders of virology. In 1898, he published results on the filtration experiments demonstrating that tobacco mosaic disease is caused by an infectious agent smaller than a bacterium.

His results were in accordance with the similar observation made by Dmitri Ivanovsky in 1892. Like Ivanovsky before him and Adolf Mayer, predecessor at Wageningen, Beijerinck could not culture the filterable infectious agent; however, he concluded that the agent can replicate and multiply in living plants. He named the new pathogen virus to indicate its non-bacterial nature. Beijerinck asserted that the virus was somewhat liquid in nature, calling it "contagium vivum fluidum" (contagious living fluid). It was not until the first crystals of the tobacco mosaic virus (TMV) obtained by Wendell Stanley in 1935, the first electron micrographs of TMV produced in 1939 and the first X-ray crystallographic analysis of TMV performed in 1941 proved that the virus was particulate.

Nitrogen fixation, the process by which diatomic nitrogen gas is converted to ammonium ions and becomes available to plants, was also investigated by Beijerinck. Bacteria perform nitrogen fixation, dwelling inside root nodules of certain plants (legumes). In addition to having discovered a biochemical reaction vital to soil fertility and agriculture, Beijerinck revealed this archetypical example of symbiosis between plants and bacteria.

Beijerinck discovered the phenomenon of bacterial sulfate reduction, a form of anaerobic respiration. He learned bacteria could use sulfate as a terminal electron acceptor, instead of oxygen. This discovery has had an important impact on our current understanding of biogeochemical cycles. Spirillum desulfuricans, now known as Desulfovibrio desulfuricans, the first known sulfate-reducing bacterium, was isolated and described by Beijerinck.

Beijerinck invented the enrichment culture, a fundamental method of studying microbes from the environment. He is often incorrectly credited with framing the microbial ecology idea that "everything is everywhere, but, the environment selects", which was stated by Lourens Baas Becking.

== Personal life ==
Beijerinck was a socially eccentric figure. He was verbally abusive to students, never married, and had few professional collaborations. He was also known for his ascetic lifestyle and his view of science and marriage being incompatible. His low popularity with his students and their parents periodically depressed him, as he very much loved spreading his enthusiasm for biology in the classroom. After his retirement at the Delft School of Microbiology in 1921, at age 70, he moved to Gorssel where he lived for the rest of his life, together with his two sisters.

== Recognition ==
Beijerinckia (a genus of bacteria), Beijerinckiaceae (a family of Hyphomicrobiales), and Beijerinck crater are named after him.

The M.W. Beijerinck Virology Prize (M.W. Beijerinck Virologie Prijs) is awarded in his honor.

== See also ==
- History of virology
- Nitrification
- Clostridium beijerinckii
- Sergei Winogradsky
