= Andrei Famintsyn =

Russian botanist (1835–1918)

Andrei Sergeyevich Famintsyn
- Андрей Сергеевич Фаминцын
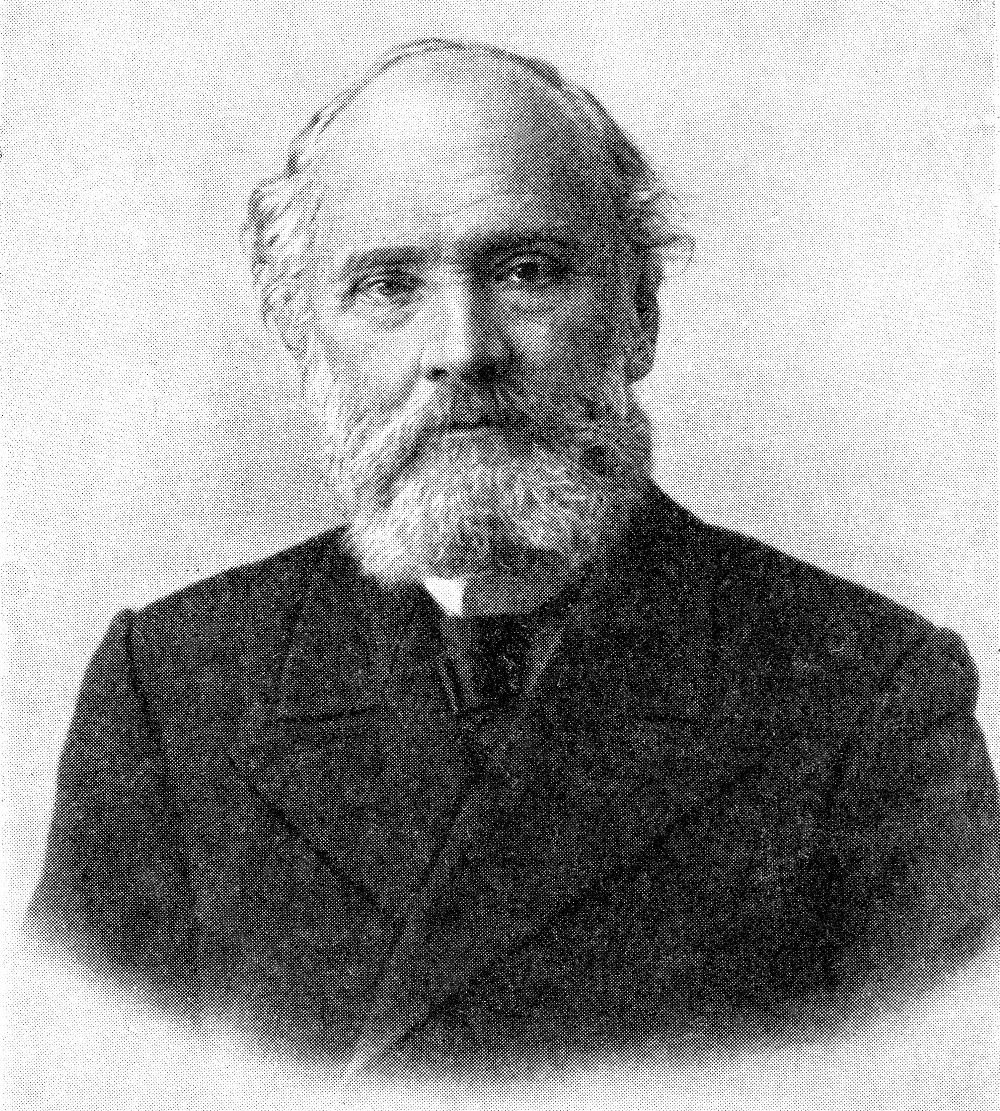
- Andrei Famintsyn in 1895
- Born: 29 June (O.S. 17 June) 1835; Moscow
- Died: 8 December 1918; Saint Petersburg
- Occupation: Botanist

Andrei Sergeyevich Famintsyn (Russian: Андрей Серге́евич Фаминцын; 29 June (O.S. 17 June) 1835, Moscow – 8 December 1918, Petrograd) was a Russian botanist, public figure, and academician of the Petersburg Academy of Sciences (1884).

== Career ==
Famintsyn attended Saint Petersburg State University and studied under Russian fungal expert Lev Semionovich Tsenkovsky. In 1861, he continued his scientific career as a teacher at his alma mater and became a professor (1867-1889). In 1890, Famintsyn founded and headed the Laboratory of Plant Anatomy and Physiology of the Academy of Sciences (today's Timiryazev Institute of Plant Physiology of the Russian Academy of Sciences).

Famintsyn is considered the founding father of the Petersburg School of plant physiologists (Ivan Borodin, Alexander Batalin, Dmitry Ivanovsky and others). In 1887, he authored the first Russian textbook on plant physiology. In 1906-1909, he was the president of the Free Economic Society. In 1915, Famintsyn was elected honorary president of the Russian Botanical Society.

== Research ==
His major works were dedicated to photosynthesis and plant metabolism. He was the first to use artificial light for plant growing and research, using kerosene lamps in the mid 1860s to measure how much energy plants used. Famintsyn showed that carbon dioxide conversion by plants and formation of starch may occur under artificial lighting. He and his student Osip Baranetsky were the first to separate unicellular green algae from lichens.

Famintsyn discovered the symbiosis of algae with radiolaria and he developed a theory of symbiogenesis, alongside Konstantin Mereschkowski.
