= Contagium vivum fluidum =

Early phrase to describe viruses

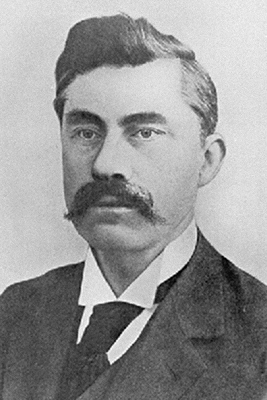
Martinus Beijerinck

Contagium vivum fluidum (Latin: "contagious living fluid") was a phrase first used to describe a virus, and underlined its ability to slip through the finest ceramic filters then available, giving it almost liquid properties. Martinus Beijerinck (1851–1931), a Dutch microbiologist and botanist, first used the term when studying the tobacco mosaic virus, becoming convinced that the virus had a liquid nature.

The word "virus", from the Latin for "poison", was originally used to refer to any infectious agent, and gradually became used to refer to infectious particles. Bacteria could be seen under microscope, and cultured on agar plates. In 1890, Louis Pasteur declared "tout virus est un microbe": "all infectious diseases are caused by microbes".

In 1892, Dmitri Ivanovsky discovered that the cause of tobacco mosaic disease could pass through Chamberland's porcelain filter. Infected sap, passed through the filter, retained its infectious properties. Ivanovsky thought the disease was caused by an extremely small bacteria, too small to see under microscope, which secreted a toxin. It was this toxin, he thought, which passed through the filter. However, he was unable to culture the purported bacteria.

In 1898, Beijerinck independently found the cause of the disease could pass through porcelain filters. He disproved Ivanovsky's toxin theory by demonstrating infection in series. He found that although he could not culture the infectious agent, it would diffuse through an agar gel. This diffusion inspired him to put forward the idea of a non-cellular "contagious living fluid", which he called a "virus". This was somewhere between a molecule and a cell.

Ivanovsky, irked that Beijerinck had not cited him, demonstrated that particles of ink could also diffuse through agar gel, thus leaving the particulate or fluid nature of the pathogen unresolved. Beijerinck's critics including Ivanovsky argued that the idea of a "contagious living fluid" was a contradiction in terms. However, Beijerinck only used the phrase "contagium vivum fluidum" in the title of his paper, using the word "virus" throughout.

Other scientists began to identify other diseases caused by infectious agents which could pass through a porcelain filter. These became known as "filterable viruses", and later just "viruses". In 1923 Edmund Beecher Wilson wrote "We have now arrived at a borderland, where the cytologist and the colloidal chemist are almost within hailing distance of each other". In 1935 American biochemist and virologist Wendell Meredith Stanley was able to crystallize and isolate the tobacco mosaic virus. Stanley found the crystals were effectively living chemicals: they could be dissolved and would regain their infectious properties.

The tobacco mosaic virus was the first virus to be photographed with an electron microscope, in 1939. Over the second half of the twentieth century, more than 2,000 virus species infecting animals, plants and bacteria were discovered.
