= Plaque-forming unit =

Measure of the number of particles capable of forming plaques per unit volume

A plaque-forming unit (PFU) is a measure used in virology to describe the number of virus particles capable of forming plaques per unit volume. It is a proxy measurement rather than a measurement of the absolute quantity of particles: viral particles that are defective or which fail to infect their target cell will not produce a plaque and thus will not be counted.

For example, a solution of tick-borne encephalitis virus with a concentration of 1,000 PFU/μL indicates that 1 μL of the solution contains enough virus particles to produce 1000 infectious plaques in a layer of cells. However, the number of virus particles might be greater than the number of PFU if some virus particles fail to form plaques because they are defective or otherwise failed to infect cells. The concept of plaque-forming units of virus is equivalent to the concept of colony-forming units of bacteria.

== See also ==
- Viral load
- Minimal infective dose
- Virus quantification
