= Selenite broth =

Selenite broth is used as a selective medium for the isolation of Salmonella species. Selenite broth was originated by Leifson, while observing good recovery of Salmonella spp. and reduced growth of fecal coliforms. Selenite broth is used as a selective enrichment for the cultivation of Salmonella spp. that may be present in small numbers and competing with intestinal flora. This medium must not be autoclaved. Once prepared, it is steamed at 100°C for 30 minutes. There should be a very slight red precipitate. To minimize the risk of teratogenicity to workers, sodium selenite must be added separately to the medium. It has a pH of approximately 7.1. Selenite broth gives pale or colorless colonies.

Selenite broth contains:

Peptone	5g/l
Mannitol	4g/l
Di-sodium hydrogen phosphate	9.5g/l
Sodium di-hydrogen phosphate	10g/l
Sodium selenite (NaHSeO_{3})	4g/l
