= D50 (radiotherapy) =

D50 in medicine is the half-maximal dose: the dose that produces 50% of the maximum response. It may specifically refer to the radiation dose required to achieve a 50% tumor control probability.

== See also ==
- LD_{50}, is the dose required to kill half the members of a tested population after a specified test duration.
