= Frederick Twort =

English bacteriologist

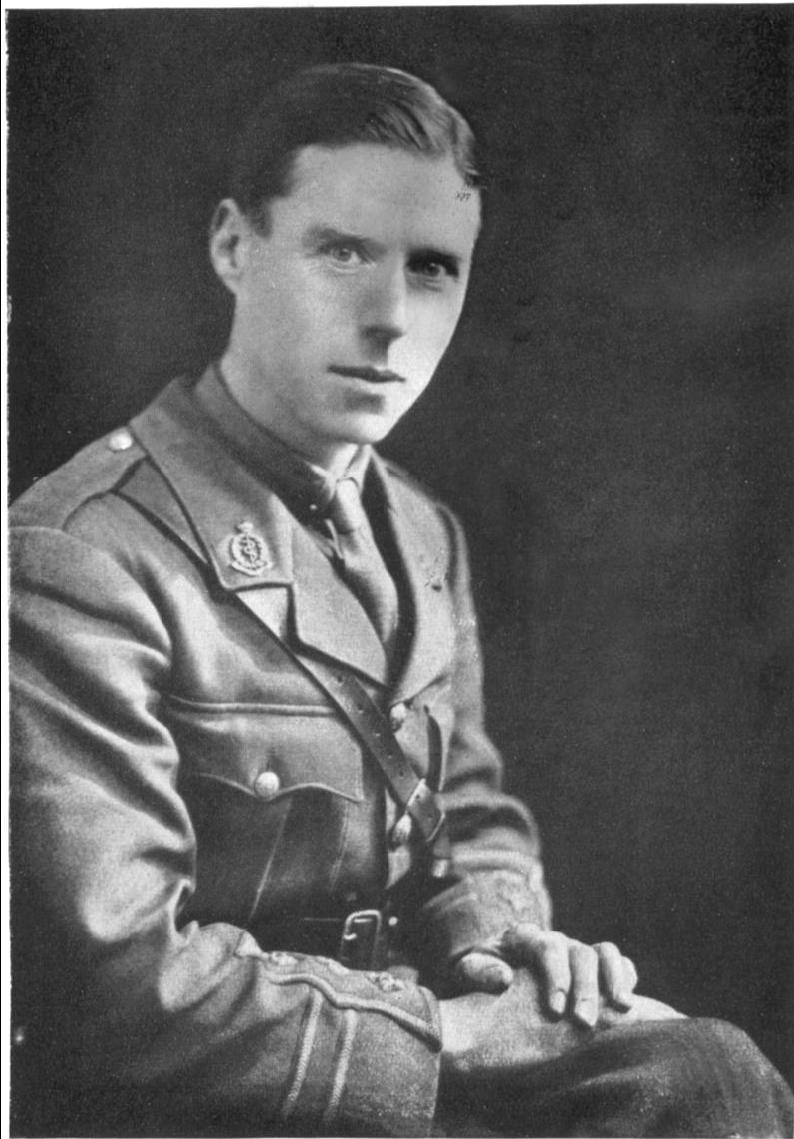
- Frederick Twort
- Born: 22 October 1877; Camberley, Surrey, England
- Died: 20 March 1950 (aged 72)
- Education: St Thomas's Hospital
- Known for: Bacteriophages
- Spouse: Dorothy Nony Banister
- Parents: Dr William Henry Twort; Elizabeth Webster
- Awards: Fellow of the Royal Society
- Scientific career
- Fields: Bacteriology
- Workplaces: University of London

Frederick William Twort FRS (22 October 1877 – 20 March 1950) was an English bacteriologist and was the original discoverer in 1915 of bacteriophages (viruses that infect bacteria). He studied medicine at St Thomas's Hospital, London, was superintendent of the Brown Institute for Animals (a pathology research centre), and was a professor of bacteriology at the University of London. He researched into Johne's disease, a chronic intestinal infection of cattle, and also discovered that vitamin K is needed by growing leprosy bacteria.

== Early life and scientific training ==
The eldest of the eleven children of Dr. William Henry Twort, Frederick Twort was born in Camberley, Surrey on 22 October 1877. The three eldest sons went to Tomlinson's Modern School in Woking. From 1894 Frederick studied medicine at St Thomas's Hospital, London. After qualifying in medicine (Membership of the Royal College of Surgeons, Licentiate of the Royal College of Physicians) in 1900, Twort took the first paid post available, assistant to Dr. Louis Jenner, Superintendent of the Clinical Laboratory of St Thomas' Hospital. There he trained in pathological techniques. In 1902 he became assistant to the Bacteriologist of the London Hospital, Dr. William Bulloch, later F.R.S., and carried out single-handed the whole diagnostic routine of the hospital. In 1909, Twort became the superintendent of the Brown Animal Sanatory Institution, a pathology research centre, and remained there for the duration of his career. In 1919 Twort married Dorothy Nony, daughter of Frederick J. Banister, and together they had three daughters and a son.

== Major work ==
=== Mutation ===
Early in the history of microbiology, bacteria were often differentiated by testing their ability to grow on different media. Twort's first important paper found some shortcomings to this method. He found that the major subgroups identified by sugar fermentation were not capable of clear-cut subdivision by tests on glucosides, nor even were they strictly separable by sugars. Twort wrote, "It seems, therefore, probable that the separate micro-organisms in the various subgroups are not to be regarded as distinct species, but as varieties or hybrids of one or more species. If this be so, one might expect them to be constantly varying, losing old characters and gaining new ones according to the conditions under which they are grown, and it was with the object of testing this hypothesis that further series of experiments were undertaken." Following prolonged incubation in media that they previously failed to ferment, several species acquired fermentation powers which originally they did not enjoy. We now know that these mutant individuals able to ferment novel sugars arose in culture, and came to dominate the population. Although ignored at the time - a trend that seemed to plague his career - this work was quite prescient, and anticipated by decades the subsequent work on adaptation and mutation by bacterial chemists and microbiologists.

=== Growth factors ===
Leprosy was still a major concern during the early part of the 20th century. However, work on leprosy was frustrated by the inability to culture the leprosy bacillus in the laboratory. Twort suspected that the leprosy bacillus had a 'close relationship' with the tubercle bacillus, a species that was culturable. Twort wrote, "It appeared highly probable that these two organisms would require the same chemical substances for building up their protoplasm, which could be elaborated from the ordinary media only by the tubercle bacillus." Twort therefore incorporated dead tubercle bacilli in the growth medium and succeeded in culturing leprosy. The essential substance supplied by the tubercle bacillus that was missing from the medium turned out to be vitamin K. Twort's experiment is important as a demonstration of an organism growing only when supplied with a substance elaborated by another. This is the essential feature of all growth factor investigations and the basis of all studies of bacterial nutrition. However, this work, too, was ignored for several decades.

=== Johne's disease ===
Twort also researched Johne's disease, a chronic intestinal infection of cattle. Similarly to leprosy, Johne's bacillus could not be cultivated on ordinary media. Incorporation of dead tubercle bacilli in the medium was successful. Johne's bacillus had been cultivated for the first time. Contrary to previous efforts, Twort's work was recognized immediately.

=== Twort-d'Herelle phenomenon ===
Twort and his brother, Dr. C. C. Twort, had for some years been trying to grow viruses in artificial media hoping to find a nonpathogenic virus, which might be the wild type of a pathogenic one, so more likely to grow. In 1914, Twort set out to identify the elusive (now known to be nonexistent) "essential substance" that would allow vaccinia virus to grow in vitro. At the time, smallpox vaccines had to be made in the skin of calves and was almost always contaminated with the bacterial genus Staphylococcus. Twort speculated the contaminating bacteria might be the source of the "essential substance" needed by vaccinia to survive. He plated some of the smallpox vaccines on nutrient agar slants and obtained large bacterial colonies of several colours. Upon closer examination of the colonies with a magnifying glass, he found minute glassy areas that would not grow when subcultured. He quickly realized these glassy areas were the result of the destruction of the bacterial cells and was able to pick from some of these areas and transmit this from one staphylococci colony to another.

Further experiments showed the agent could pass through porcelain filters and it required bacteria for growth. These observations show Twort had discovered most of the essential features of bacteriophages, although Twort seemed to favor the idea that the principle was not a separate form of life, but an enzyme which is secreted by the bacteria. Twort published these results in The Lancet in 1915 and called the contagion the bacteriolytic agent. Unfortunately, his discovery was ignored; Félix d'Herelle discovered phages independently, and Twort's work may have been lost to time, but for Jules Bordet and Andre Gratia's rediscovery of Twort's paper.

== World War I ==
In the middle of his work, war broke out and a grant from the Local Government Board came to an end. Further, he became interested in the Royal Army Medical Corps and actually left for Salonika, where he was in charge of the base laboratory, a few weeks after his phage paper was published. Supposedly after that point, Twort was inundated with routine and could no longer pursue his research. To explain why he did not continue his work on bacteriophages, Twort responded, "it was sometime after the end of the war before I was really free again to continue the investigation, but at that time most of the additional details of the phenomenon had been published by other workers under the title of 'the bacteriophage'. So I passed on to other work." This excuse is rather puzzling since, in 1919, bacteriophage research was still in its infancy.

== Postwar work ==
Following the war, the recently formed Medical Research Committee (Council) supplemented Twort's salary as a university professor by an annual grant but he never was given an assistant to help with the great number of experiments he had in mind. He struggled on under difficult and depressing conditions with singlemindedness and intense interest in his work. Twort and others wanted to use these bacteriolytic agents to cure bacterial diseases in humans and animals. When this proved to be unsuccessful, Twort went back to expanding his original idea that the bacteriolytic agents themselves needed an addition (essential) factor of a more exceptional nature to satisfy their fundamental needs. He searched for a substance that would allow viruses to grow apart from other forms of life (i.e. a host organism) and when this was unsuccessful, he tried to prove that bacteria evolved from viruses. His prime idea was to devise conditions for the cultivation of viruses from abiotic precursors or hypothetical pre-virus forms which might exist in nature. These experiments, while failures, presaged the famous Miller-Urey experiments of the 1950s. Although he was elected a Fellow of the Royal Society in May 1929, Twort was never again to publish work of any serious import. On 19 November 1931 London University's Senate conferred on him the title of Professor of Bacteriology on the following grounds: 1. His distinguished contributions by research to the advancement of his subject. 2. His powers of exposition. 3. His eminence in his subject.

Financial support for his research dwindled, his stipend from the MRC ended in 1936, and his laboratory was destroyed by a bomb in 1944. The University of London took this opportunity to deprive Twort of his post and research facilities. He was allowed to store the research equipment at his home in Camberley. In 1949, Penguin Books published his chapter on the Discovery of the Bacteriophage alongside a chapter on the Bacteriophage by Felix d'Herelle in the popular series Science News. Twort died on 30 March 1950.

== Bibliography ==
- Includes material paraphrased from Molecular Cloning A Laboratory Manual, Third Edition, Sambrook and Russell, Volume I, p. 2.109. Information Panel: Bacteriophages: Historical Perspective.
- Twort, F. (1925). "The Transmissible Bacterial Lysin and Its Action on Dead Bacteria". The Lancet. 206 (5326): 642–644. doi:10.1016/S0140-6736(00)90041-2.
