= Dmitri Ivanovsky =

Russian botanist (1864–1920)

- Ivanovsky, c. 1915
- Born: 28 October 1864; Nizy, Gdovsky Uyezd, Saint Petersburg Governorate, Russian Empire
- Died: 20 June 1920 (aged 55); Rostov-on-Don, Russian SFSR
- Education: St. Petersburg Imperial University
- Known for: Discovery of viruses, Tobacco mosaic virus
- Scientific career
- Fields: Virology
- Workplaces: St. Petersburg Imperial University; Imperial University of Warsaw; Saint Vladimir Imperial University of Kiev; Donskoy University
- Doctoral advisor: Andrei Famintsyn

Dmitri Iosifovich Ivanovsky (alternative spelling Dmitrii or Dmitry Iwanowski; Russian: Дми́трий Ио́сифович Ивано́вский; (Note: Дмитрій Іосифовичъ Ивановскій in Russian pre-revolutionary script.) 28 October 1864 – 20 June 1920) was a Russian botanist, the co-discoverer of viruses (1892), and one of the founders of virology.

== Life ==
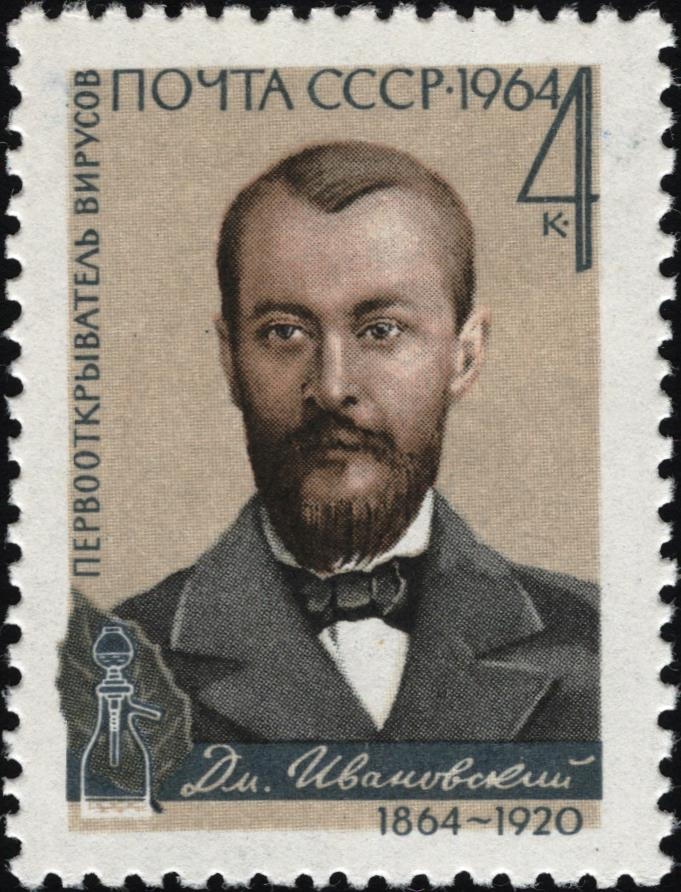
Soviet stamp (1964)

Ivanovsky was born in the village of Nizy, Gdov Uyezd. He studied at the University of Saint Petersburg under Andrei Famintsyn in 1887, when he was sent to Ukraine and Bessarabia to investigate a tobacco disease causing great damage to plantations located there at the time. Three years later, he was assigned to look into a similar disease occurrence of tobacco plants, this time raging in the Crimea region. He discovered that both incidents of disease were caused by an extremely minuscule infectious agent, capable of permeating porcelain Pasteur-Chamberland filters, something which bacteria could never do. He described his findings in an article (1892) and a dissertation (1902). Then he worked at the Imperial University of Warsaw and at Donskoy University in Rostov on Don.

In 1898, the Dutch microbiologist Martinus Beijerinck independently replicated Ivanovsky's experiments and became convinced that the filtered solution contained a new form of infectious agent, which he named virus. Beijerinck subsequently acknowledged Ivanovsky's priority in the discovery of the filterable, submicroscopic entity.

== Sources ==
- Lecoq, H (October 2001). "Découverte du premier virus, le virus de la mosaïque du tabac: 1892 ou 1898?" [Discovery of the first virus, the tobacco mosaic virus: 1892 or 1898?]. Comptes Rendus de l'Académie des Sciences. Series III – Sciences de la Vie (in French). 324 (10): 929–33. Bibcode:2001CRASG.324..929L. doi:10.1016/S0764-4469(01)01368-3. PMID 11570281.
