= Telluride House =

Residential community in Cornell University

- Cornell Branch of the Telluride Association
- Abbreviation: CBTA
- Named after: Telluride, Colorado
- Established: 1910
- Founder: Lucien Lucius Nunn
- Type: Residential student society
- Members: Cornell University undergraduate students, graduate students and faculty
- Affiliations: Telluride Association
- Website: telluridehouse.org

Telluride House
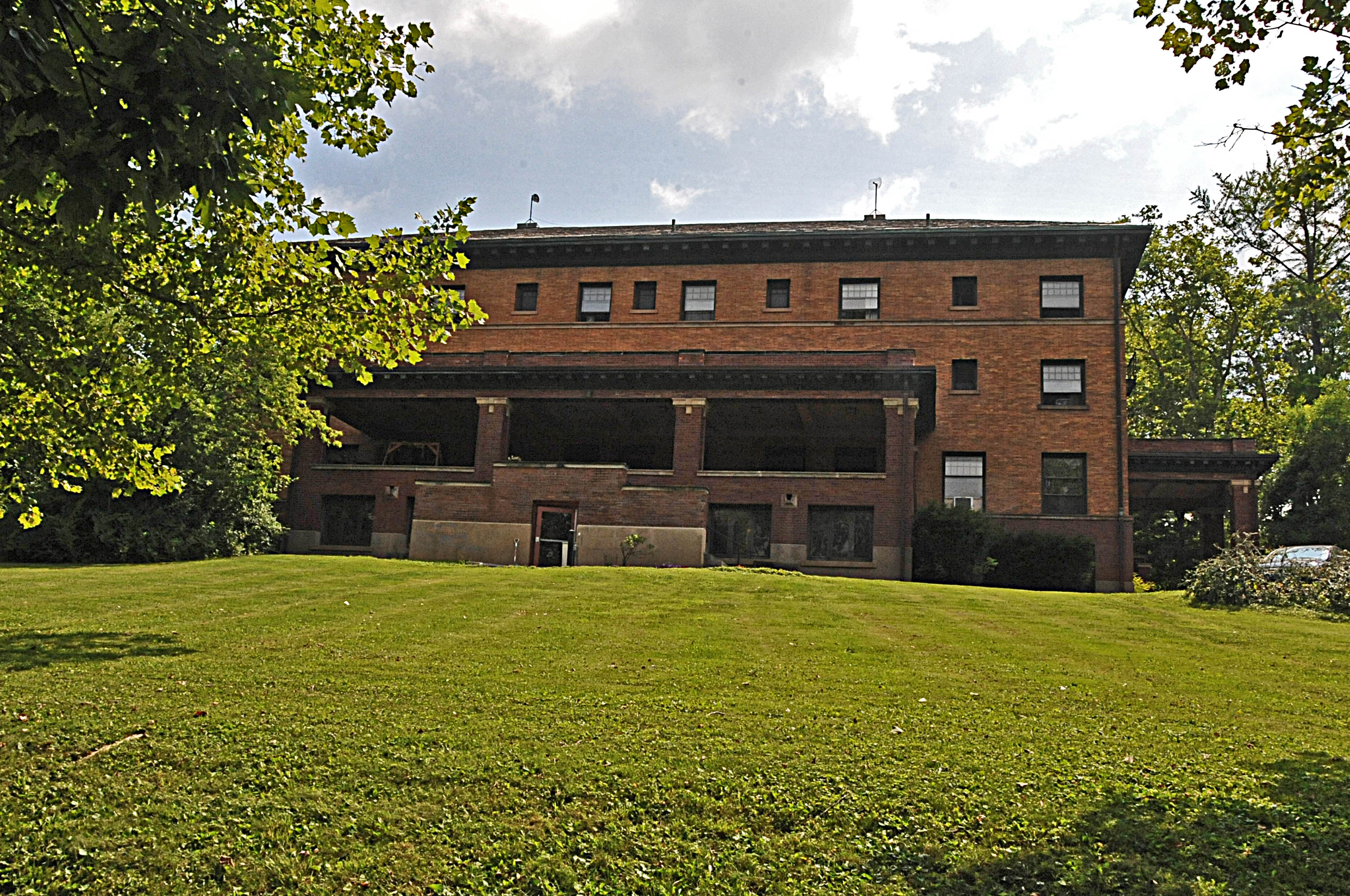
- The Telluride House, as seen from West Avenue

- Location of the Telluride House Telluride House (the United States)
- 42°26′45″N 76°29′13″W
- Location: 217 West Ave (Cornell University West Campus); Ithaca, New York; United States

History
- Built: 1910

Site notes
- Elevation: 712 feet (217 m)
- Architect: William H. Lepper
- Architectural style: Arts and Crafts (American Craftsman)
- Restored: 1985
- Restored by: Telluride Association

U.S. National Register of Historic Places
- Designated: February 22, 2011
- Reference no.: 11000042

The Telluride House, formally the Cornell Branch of the Telluride Association (CBTA), and commonly referred to as just "Telluride", is a highly selective residential community of Cornell University students and faculty. Founded in 1910 by American industrialist L. L. Nunn, the house grants room and board scholarships to a number of undergraduate and graduate students, post-doctoral researchers and faculty members affiliated with the university's various colleges and programs. A fully residential intellectual society, the Telluride House takes as its pillars democratic self-governance, communal living and intellectual inquiry. Students granted the house's scholarship are known as Telluride Scholars.

The Telluride House is considered the first program of the educational non-profit Telluride Association, which was founded a year after the house was built and was first led by the Smithsonian Institution’s fourth Secretary Charles Doolittle Walcott. Nunn went on to found Deep Springs College in 1917. The Telluride Association founded and maintained other branches thereafter, two of which—at Cornell University and at the University of Michigan—are still active. The Association also runs free selective programs for high school students, including the Telluride Association Summer Program.

In its more than a century of operation, the house's membership has included some of Cornell's most notable alumni and faculty members. Located in the university's West Campus, the Telluride House is listed on the National Register of Historic Places.

== History ==
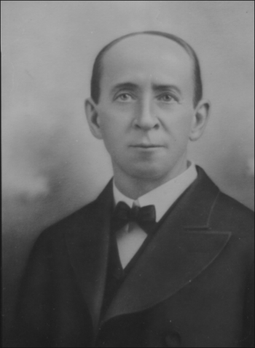
Lucien Lucius Nunn, Telluride House founder.

Lucien Lucius Nunn was an American industrialist and entrepreneur involved in the early electrification of the mining industry. To staff the power plants he built, including ones in Colorado and the Olmsted Station Powerhouse in Provo, Utah, Nunn created an early work study program, which he named 'Telluride Institute' after his city of residence of Telluride, Colorado. In the Institute, Nunn's students were trained in engineering and the liberal arts. Upon completion of their institute program, the student workers were sent to various academic institutions on a scholarship from Nunn to further their education. Many of these students went on to study at Cornell University's engineering programs. On Cornell University's campus in Ithaca, Nunn built the Telluride House as a scholarship residence "for bright young men", many of whom have passed through Nunn's Telluride Institute.

The house's initial purpose, as described by Cornell historian Morris Bishop was "to grant [the students] release from all material concern, a background of culture, the responsibility of managing their own household, and the opportunity to live and learn from resident faculty members and eminent visitors [to the university]". The house started electing members from disciplines outside engineering within years of its founding. With a solely male membership for its first half century of existence, the house would start electing female members to its residential scholarship in the 1960s, starting with U.S. Secretary of Labor Frances Perkins as a resident faculty fellow in 1960, Laura Wolfowitz (the elder sister of American politician and academic Paul Wolfowitz, himself a house member) as a house member in 1962, and literary theorist and postcolonial scholar Gayatri Spivak as a house member in 1963.

== Building ==
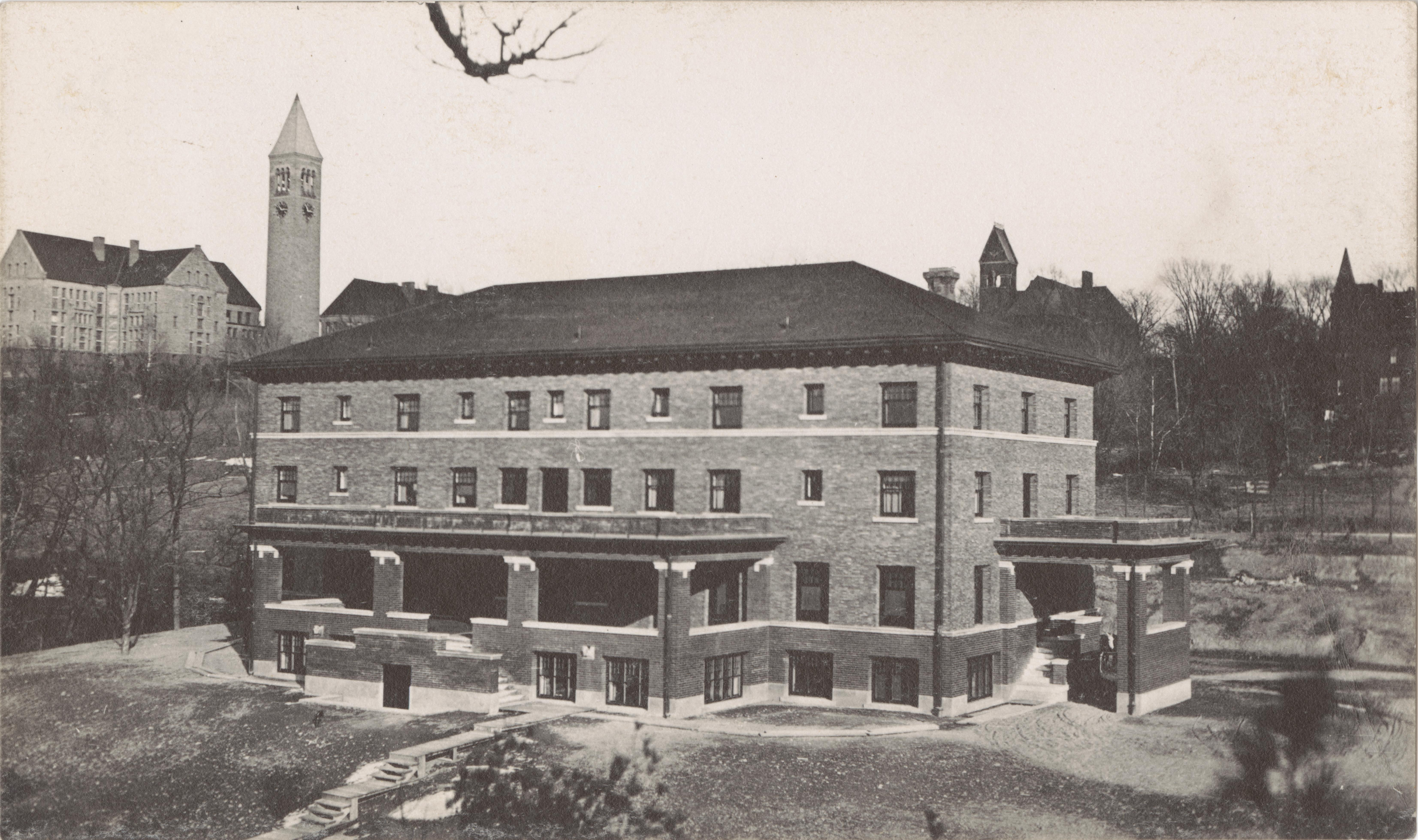
The earliest known photograph of the Telluride House, taken in the year of its founding, 1910. Visible in the background are McGraw Tower, Uris Library and Barnes Hall.

The Telluride House is located on Cornell University's West Campus, directly downhill from Willard Straight Hall, and houses Telluride scholars as well as the Telluride Association's main office. It has been described as an "Arts and Crafts style mansion" outfitted with "expensive Mission style and Stickley furniture", with "high ceilings" and "large windows overlooking sloping lawns". A 1980s project of the Telluride Association renovated the House and furnished it in accordance with its original architectural style.

In 2011, the Telluride House building was placed on the National Register of Historic Places.

== Membership ==
Students and faculty members of Cornell University are invited to apply to the Telluride House in a yearly process known as 'preferment'. Preferment, like other house matters, is decided on democratically by house members. However, faculty members of the house cannot vote. Telluride House members also contribute to the Association's work, through reading and evaluating applications for Telluride programs, such as the Telluride Association Summer Program.

=== Notable members ===
Alumni of the Telluride House, both students and faculty members, include many notable academics, politicians and scientists. Among those are two World Bank presidents, two Nobel laureates in Physics, and a number of neoconservative scholars and politicians who co-resided in the Telluride House with House Faculty Fellow Allan Bloom in the 1960s.

Notable residents include theoretical computer scientist Scott Aaronson, British Jamaican artist and art historian Petrine Archer-Straw, classicist Martin Bernal, physicist Carl M. Bender, philosopher and classicist Allan Bloom, Nobel laureate in Physics Sir William Lawrence Bragg who resided in the house as a visiting professor, former United States Congressman and President of the World Bank Barber Conable, author Mary Tedeschi Eberstadt, Nigerian academic Michael Echeruo, theoretical physicist and Nobel laureate in Physics Richard Feynman, political scientist and political economist Francis Fukuyama, American political theorist William Galston, multiple Tony- winning director and producer and founding artistic director of the Mark Taper Forum Gordon Davidson, British philosopher Paul Grice, UCLA philosopher Barbara Herman, author and diplomat William vanden Heuvel, conservative politician and diplomat Alan Keyes, Ukrainian writer Sana Krasikov, European intellectual historian Dominick LaCapra, former New York City Schools Chancellor Harold O. Levy, University of Maryland, College Park president Wallace Loh, NYU philosopher Thomas Nagel, chemist, peace activist and Nobel Chemistry and Peace Prize laureate Linus Pauling, American classical musician Martin Pearlman, United States Secretary of Labor and the first woman appointed to the U.S. Cabinet Frances Perkins, historian Kenneth Pomeranz, Cornell philosopher, dean and vice-president George Holland Sabine, gender and queer studies theorist Eve Kosofsky Sedgwick, American anthropologist Clare Selgin Wolfowitz, political scientist Stephen Sestanovich, political scientist Abram Shulsky, political theorist Joseph M. Schwartz, literary theorist and postcolonial and gender studies scholar Gayatri Chakravorty Spivak, lawyer, legal scholar and former Dean of Stanford Law School Kathleen Sullivan, Czech economist and politician Jan Švejnar, theoretical physicist and Nobel laureate in Physics Steven Weinberg, Former United States Deputy Secretary of Defense, World Bank president, diplomat and academic Paul Wolfowitz, journalist and writer William T. Vollmann, and biophysicist and virologist Robley C. Williams.

Richard Feynman
Theoretical physicist and Nobel Prize laureate

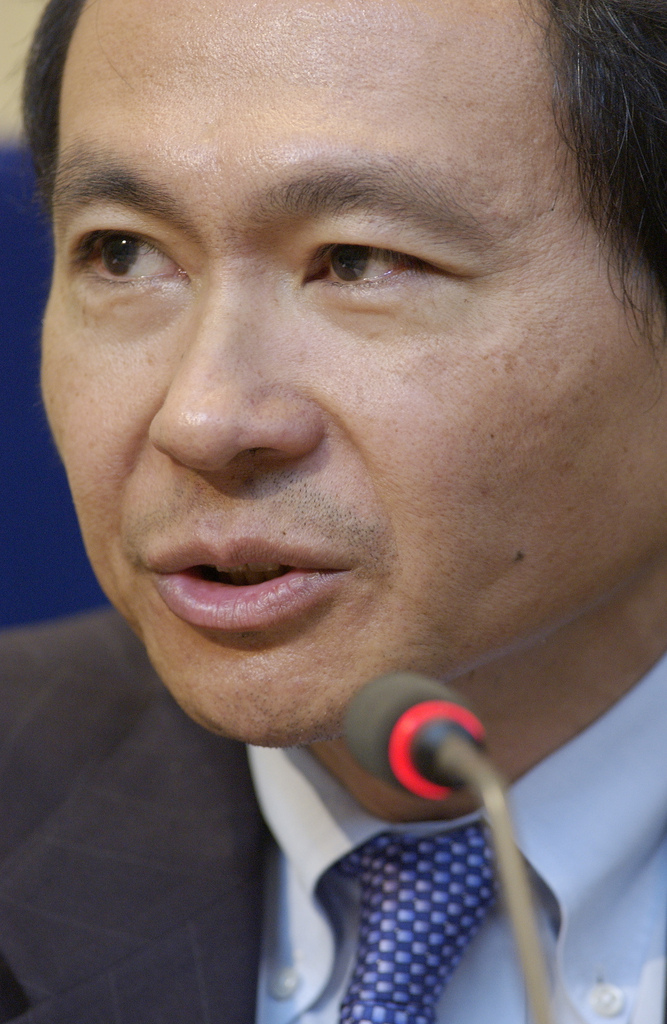
Francis Fukuyama
Political scientist and author of The End of History and the Last Man

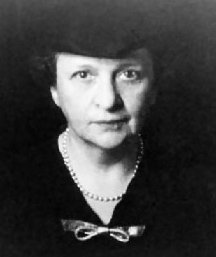
Frances Perkins
United States Secretary of Labor and first female member of the Cabinet of the United States

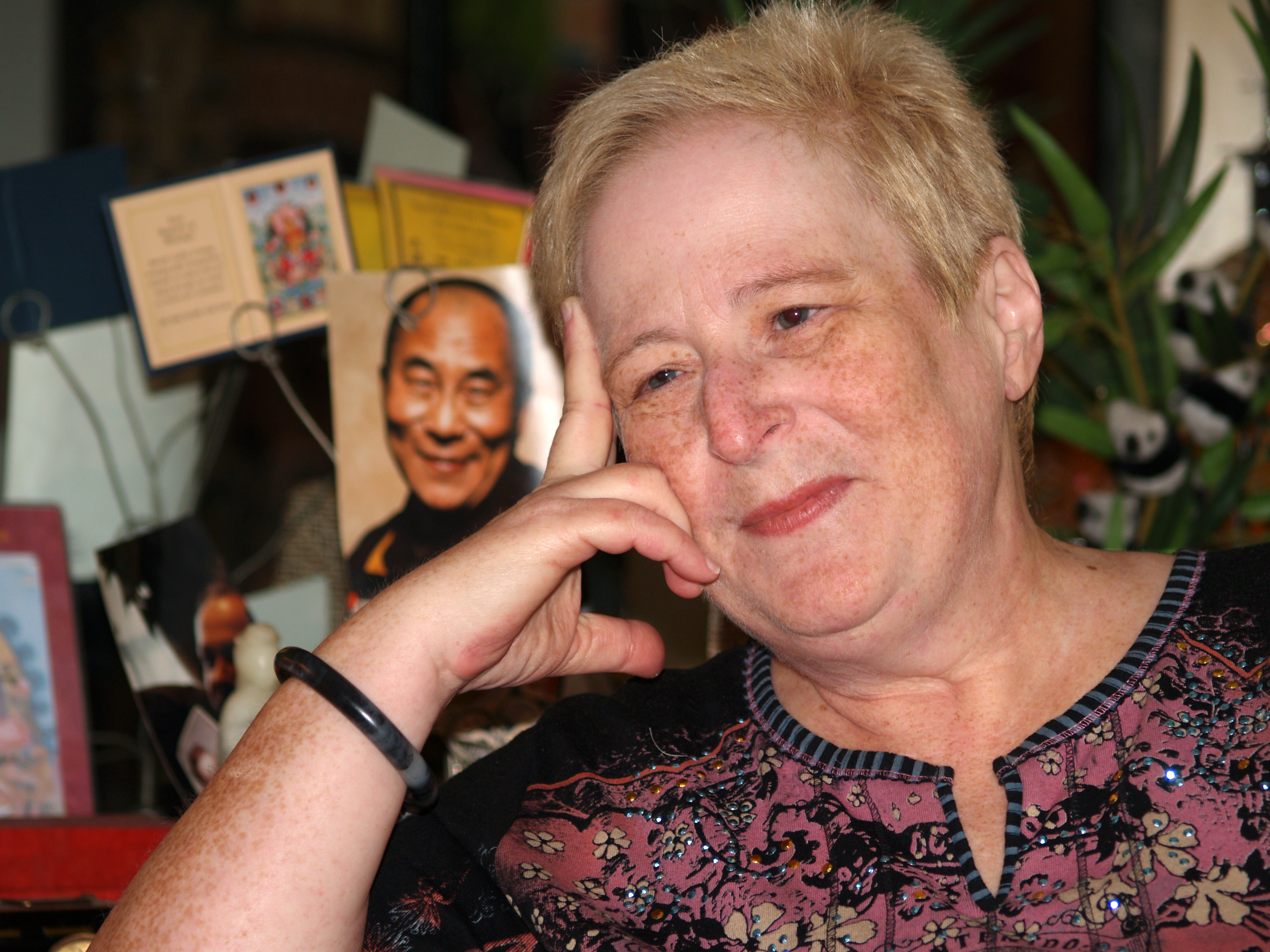
Eve Kosofsky Sedgwick
Gender studies, queer theory, and critical theory scholar

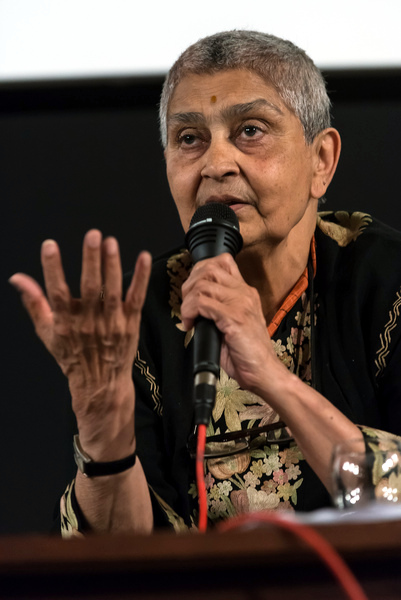
Gayatri Chakravorty Spivak
Literary theorist and postcolonial scholar

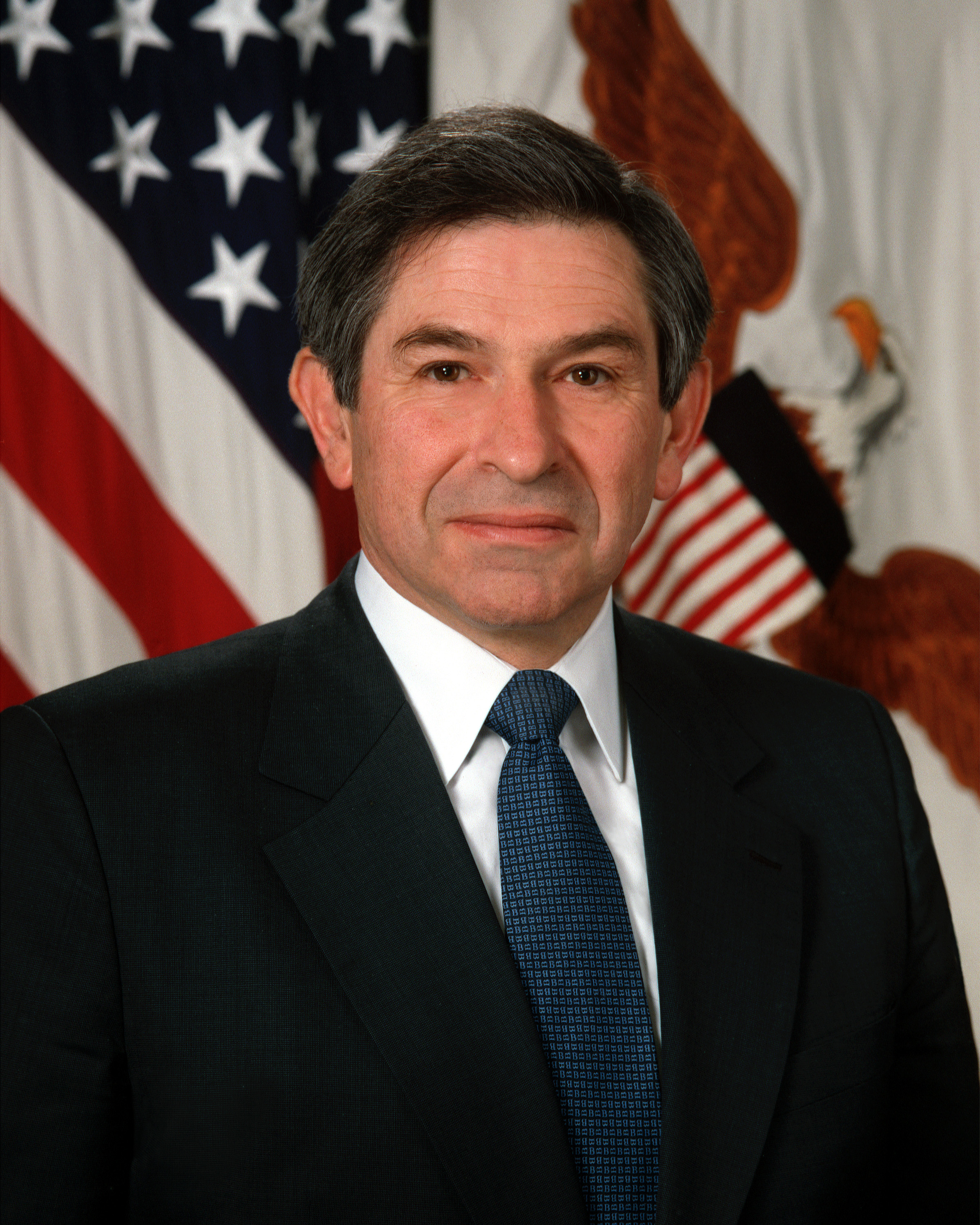
Paul Wolfowitz
Politician, diplomat, academic, and former President of the World Bank

== Reputation ==
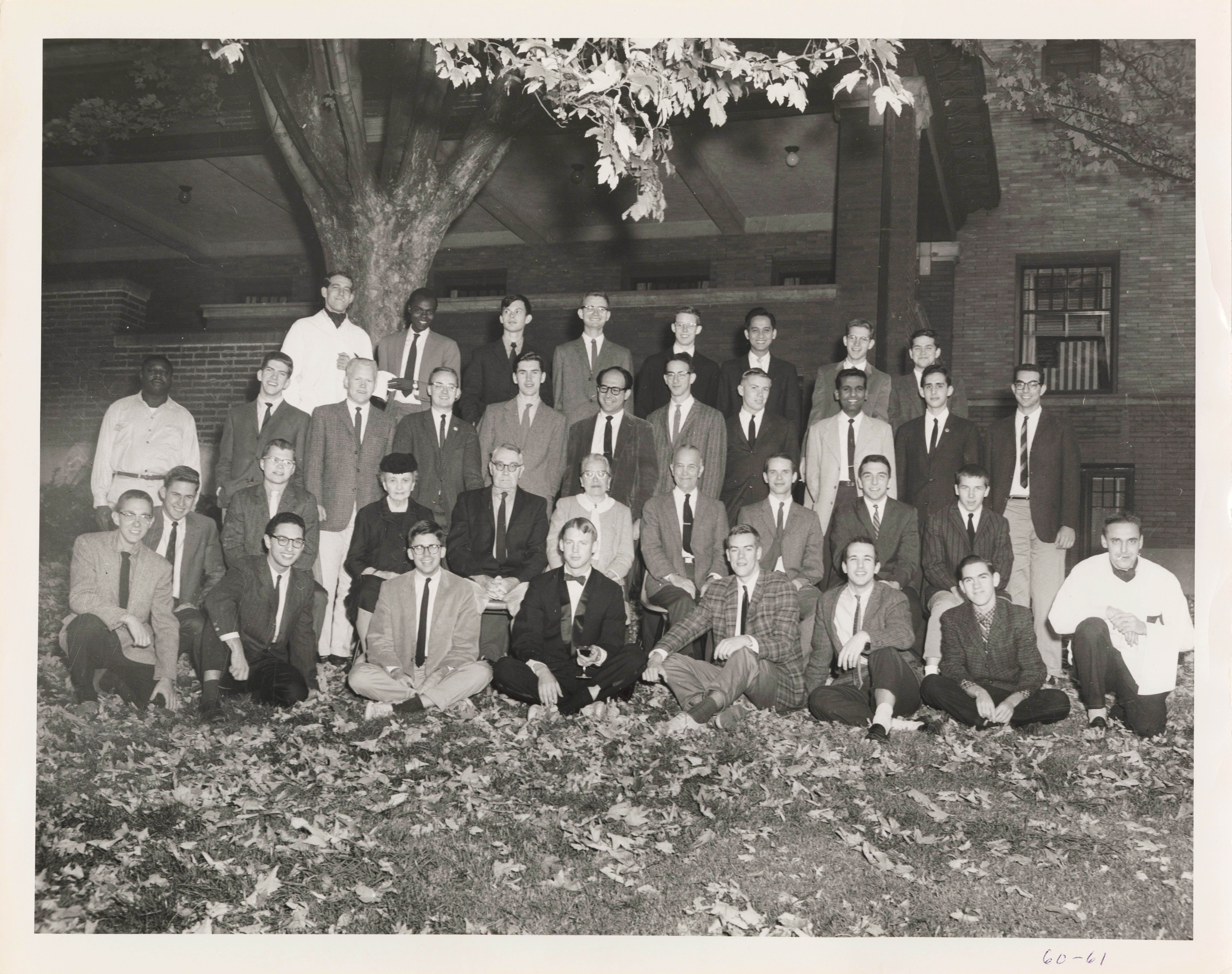
House membership in the fall of 1960. Among those pictured are Frances Perkins (the House's first female resident), Abram Shulsky, George Sabine, Carl M. Bender, and Robley Williams.

The Telluride House has been variously described as an organization "so peculiar in purpose and practice", an "unusually rich and intense academic experience", and an "intellectual non-fraternity", where residents gather "over dinner to discuss popular culture, history, civil life, or scientific advances." James Atlas, New York Times Magazine editor, described the House in the early 1970s as a "commune for philosophy students" and dubbed Allan Bloom the House's "resident Socrates". That the house was home to so many neoconservatives in the 1970s has led to it being dubbed "a designated breeding ground for conservative intellectuals in their larval state".

Frances Perkins, the longest serving U.S. Secretary of Labor and the first woman appointed to the U.S. Cabinet, was elected to the house in 1960, where she resided until her death in 1965. Her time at the house was dubbed by one of her biographers as "the happiest phase of her life". Perkins reportedly described her happiness at her invitation to the house to her friends saying, "I felt like a bride on my wedding night." She was heavily involved in the house's self-governance process, attended weekly house meetings, tended the house garden, and befriended fellow house faculty member Allan Bloom.

Richard Feynman likewise held a favorable view of the house and of his tenure as Telluride House Faculty Fellow. In an interview he described the House as "a group of boys that have been specially selected because of their scholarship, because of their cleverness or whatever it is, to be given free board and lodging and so on, because of their brains". Feynman lived at Telluride for much of his tenure at Cornell. He enjoyed the house's convenience and said that "it’s there that I did the fundamental work" for which he won the Nobel Prize. In a correspondence with a fellow Telluride associate congratulating him on the Nobel Prize, Feynman said, "It was at Telluride that I did do all that stuff for which I got the prize, so I look back at those days with nostalgia."

Eve Kosofsky Sedgwick met her husband Hal Sedgwick at the Telluride House. In her time at Cornell, women had only recently been allowed to join the Telluride House and it still had a predominantly male membership. As a result, the Telluride House was reportedly "a strongly masculine environment", and "proved a rich vein of experience for Sedgwick to mine in her explorations of homosociality", a term she popularized.

Unlike Perkins and Feynman, writer William T. Vollmann had an unfavourable view of house life and his experiences there in the early 1980s. He described house culture as "elitist", "inbred" and "vanguardist", and criticized house members' use of ingroup jargon, such as "III" or "Informal Intellectual Interchange".

== See also ==
- Telluride Association
- Lucien Lucius Nunn
- Deep Springs College
- Telluride Association Summer Program
- National Register of Historic Places listings in Tompkins County, New York
- Cornell University West Campus
