= Telluride Association =

Non-profit organization in the United States

The Telluride Association is a non-profit organization in the United States founded in 1910 by Lucien Lucius Nunn and named for his hometown, Telluride, Colorado. The organization states its mission as providing young people with free educational programs emphasizing intellectual curiosity, democratic self-governance, and social responsibility.

The Association's principal programs are summer seminars for high school students and the operation of scholarship "branches" for college students. These residential programs are selective and are offered at no cost to the students. The Association is governed largely by those elected to membership from its recent alumni, Deep Springs College alumni, and current Branch students.

== History ==
Lucien Lucius Nunn founded this association in 1910 after building the first Telluride House at Cornell University. The first President of the Telluride Association was Charles Doolittle Walcott, a paleontologist and fourth Secretary of the Smithsonian Institution. The house originally provided room and board for young men who had worked for Nunn and were studying engineering at Cornell. It has since expanded to encompass a variety of co-educational summer programs, scholarships, and additional houses. The Association is non-denominational and tied to no particular political viewpoint.

=== Telluride Houses ===
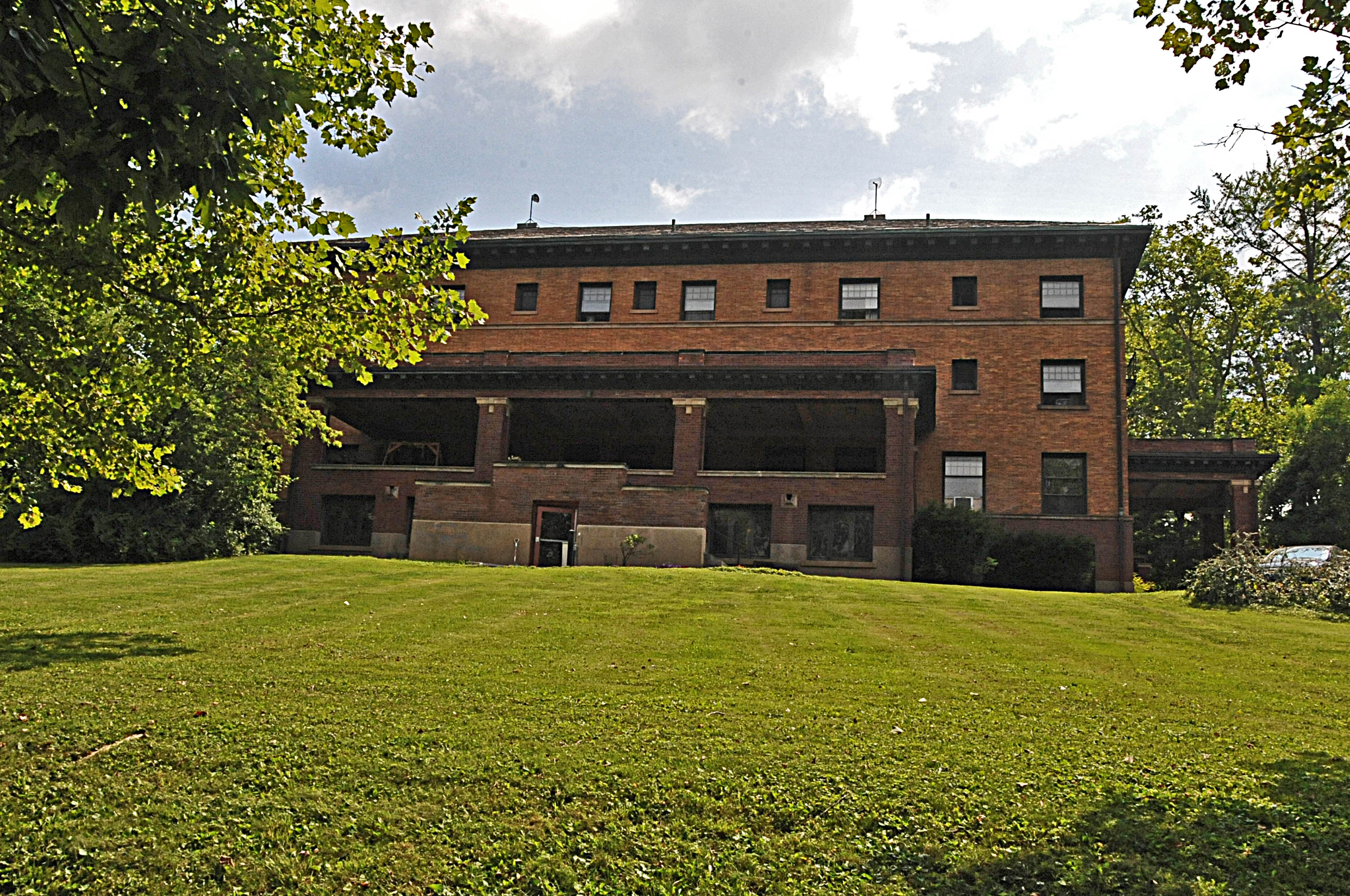
Cornell Branch of the Telluride Association (Telluride House) at Cornell University, Ithaca, NY.

Telluride Houses, or Branches, have operated at Cornell University since 1910 and at the University of Michigan since 1999. Students participate in a year-round public speaking program and plan academic seminars. The houses are largely self-governed, with somewhat different focuses: residents of Cornell Branch take on such responsibilities as hiring employees and maintaining and renovating the house, while residents of Michigan Branch plan and execute an annual project linking practical work in the community with theoretical and academic inquiry. Distinguished alumni include Steven Weinberg, Barber Conable, Eve Sedgwick, Francis Fukuyama, Paul Wolfowitz, Jan Švejnar, Dominick LaCapra, William vanden Heuvel, William T. Vollman, Stacy Abrams, Daniel Alarcón, and Gayatri Spivak, Gordon Davidson. Faculty guests also live at the houses for limited terms. Distinguished faculty guests have included Michel Foucault, Richard Feynman, Frances Perkins, Linus Pauling, and Allan Bloom.

Telluride Houses formerly existed in Pasadena, California, the University of California, Berkeley, and the University of Chicago.

=== Summer Programs ===
The Association previously offered two summer programs: Telluride Association Summer Programs (TASPs) and Telluride Association Sophomore Seminars (TASSes). Both were six-week, free educational experiences for rising high school seniors and juniors, respectively, hosted at Cornell University, the University of Michigan, Indiana University and the University of Maryland at College Park. Participants attended an intensive seminar led by college and university faculty members and participated in educational and social activities outside the classroom. Like the houses, each seminar received a discretionary budget, whose use is democratically distributed via weekly house meetings. TASPs focused on a variety of interdisciplinary themes, while TASSes focused on African American studies and related fields.

In 2022, the Telluride Association restructured the TASP and TASS programs, changing them to two new ones: the Telluride Association Summer Seminar in Critical Black Studies (TASS-CBS) and the Telluride Association Summer Seminar in Anti-Oppressive Studies (TASS-AOS).

== Awards ==
Telluride Association Awards are awarded to members of the Telluride community by the Association.

The Mansfield-Wefald Senior Thesis Prize is awarded annually for the best scholarly thesis written by a Telluride associate who will have completed his or her final year of undergraduate education that year.

The Mike Yarrow Adventurous Education Award is given annually to a returning member of a Branch of Telluride Association, or a Deep Springs student who will be entering a Branch the following year. The award funds non-paying public service activity during the summer that is outside of an academic institution.

The Nunn Archive Fellowship is awarded to help associates study and preserve the legacy of Lucien Lucius Nunn.

Beginning in the late 1950s, the Telluride House at Cornell operated a two-year postgraduate exchange scholarship program with Lincoln College of Oxford University, welcoming a Sedgwick Scholar to stay at Telluride House and to study at Cornell, usually for a master's degree, and sending a Housemember to study for an Oxford M.Phil. while resident at Lincoln College. Despite efforts of both sides, the program was ended in 2002.

The Reese Miller Exchange Scholarship is available to students at Cornell University, University of Michigan, Central European University in Budapest, Hungary, and the University of Cape Town, South Africa. The scholarship operates as an exchange for one semester or one year between recent undergraduates and graduate students at Cornell and CEU and between students at University of Michigan and UCT.

The Atkinson-Tetreault Fellowship is available to Masters in Regional Planning students at Cornell University. The award is offered once every two years and includes room and board at the Telluride House, a stipend, and a partial tuition award.

== Membership ==
Telluride Association consists of about 100 volunteer members who serve as the Association's trustees. Members are elected to membership, usually while in their twenties, on the basis of demonstrated leadership and commitment to Telluride's educational goals. The Association's membership is mainly current and former participants of its programs and alumni of Deep Springs College, a separate two-year college founded by Nunn in 1917.

== See also ==
- Telluride House
- Deep Springs College
