= Herbert Reich =

Herbert Reich may refer to:

- Herbert Reich (engineer) (1900–2000), American electrical engineer
- Herbert Reich (sailor) (born 1938), German former sailor
