= William Masters (disambiguation) =

William Masters (1915–2001) was an American gynecologist, of the Masters and Johnson sexuality research team.

William Masters may refer to:

- William Masters (rugby union) (1858–1897), Scottish rugby union player
- William Masters (politician) (1820–1906), American farmer, pioneer, and politician in Wisconsin
- William Masters (botanist) (1796–1874), English nurseryman, garden designer, and amateur botanist
- Gordon Stretton (1887–1983), born William Masters, English and Argentine musician
- William Masters (engineer)
- William A. Masters (economist)

== See also ==
- Billy Masters (disambiguation)
