= Erik Mueggler =

American anthropologist

- Education: Deep Springs College; Cornell University (BA); Johns Hopkins University (PhD)
- Awards: MacArthur Fellows Program
- Scientific career
- Fields: Anthropology
- Workplaces: University of Michigan

Erik Mueggler is an American anthropologist and professor at the University of Michigan.

== Life ==
Mueggler attended Deep Springs College and graduated from Cornell University with a B.A. in socio-cultural anthropology, and Johns Hopkins University with a Ph.D. in anthropology.

== Awards ==
- 2002 MacArthur Fellows Program
- Center for the Advanced Studies in the Behavioral Sciences Fellowship
- British Academy Fellowship

== Works ==
- The Paper Road: Archive and Experience in the Botanical Exploration of West China and Tibet (University of California Press, 2011).
- "Spectral Chains: Remembering the Great Leap Forward Famine in a Yi Community", Re-envisioning the Chinese revolution: the politics and poetics of collective memories in reform China, Editors Ching Kwan Lee, Guobin Yang, Stanford University Press, 2007, ISBN 978-0-8047-5853-6
- "Dancing Fools: Politics of Culture and Place in a 'Traditional Nationality Festival.' Modern China 28(1). 2002.
- The Age of Wild Ghosts. Memory, Violence, and Place in Southwest China, Berkeley: University of California Press. 2001, ISBN 978-0-520-22631-9
- "Spectral Subversions: Rival Tactics of Time and Agency in China." Comparative Studies in Society and History 41(3): 458–481. 1999.
- "The Poetics of Grief and the Price of Hemp in Southwest China." Journal of Asian Studies 57(4): 979–1008. 1998.
