= Deep Springs, California =

Unincorporated community in California, United States

Deep Springs
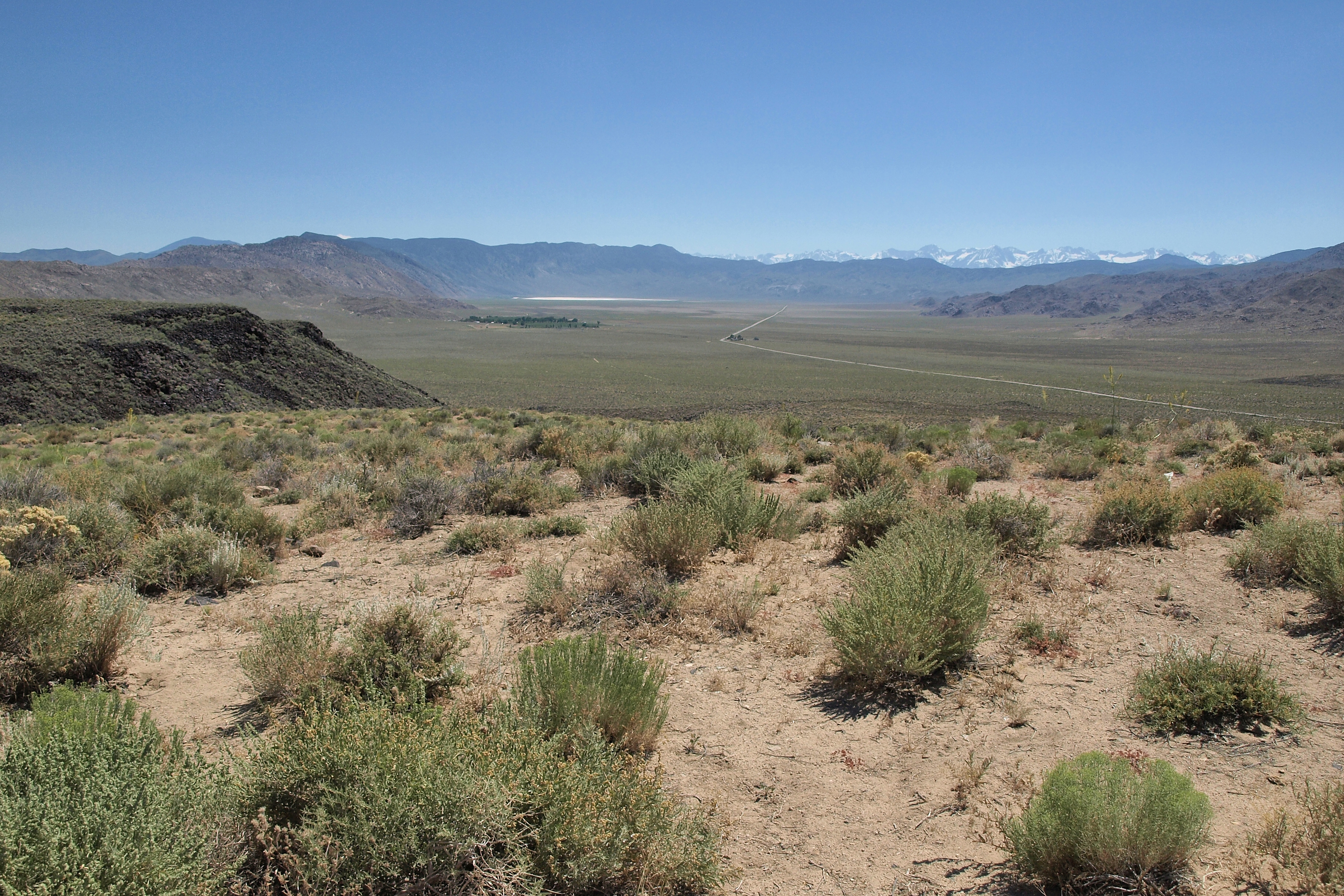
- Deep Springs Valley from Gilbert Pass

- Location in California
- Coordinates: 37°22′18″N 117°59′06″W
- Country: United States
- State: California
- County: Inyo
- Elevation: 5,194 ft (1,583 m)

Deep Springs (formerly Deep Spring) is a set of artesian springs in Inyo County, California, United States that are used for irrigation, water supply, and livestock. The springs lie within the treaty territory of the Western Bands of the Shoshone Nation of Indians (Timbisha Band of Western Shoshone Indians). It is located in the northeastern section of Deep Springs Valley, 22 miles (35 km) east of Bishop, 2.6 km (1.6 mi) north of Soldier Pass, and 6.4 km (4.0 mi) southwest of Chocolate Mountain (formerly Piper Mountain), at an elevation of 5,194 ft (1,583 m).

The area was originally home to the Deep Springs Valley Paiute prior to Euro-American settlement around the 20th century. Deeps Springs Valley has a semi-arid desert climate, and the springs create an environment with a variety of animal and plant life.

Deep Springs College is located in Deep Springs Valley, although not at the site of the springs. The students of Deep Springs College engage in a program emphasizing labor as a fundamental pillar of their studies. The students participate in a minimum of twenty hours of labor per week: milking cows, irrigating the farm, and learning about the land. The Deep Springs post office operated from 1881 to 1883 and 1920 to 1953. The springs, after which the town was named, are now called Buckhorn Springs.

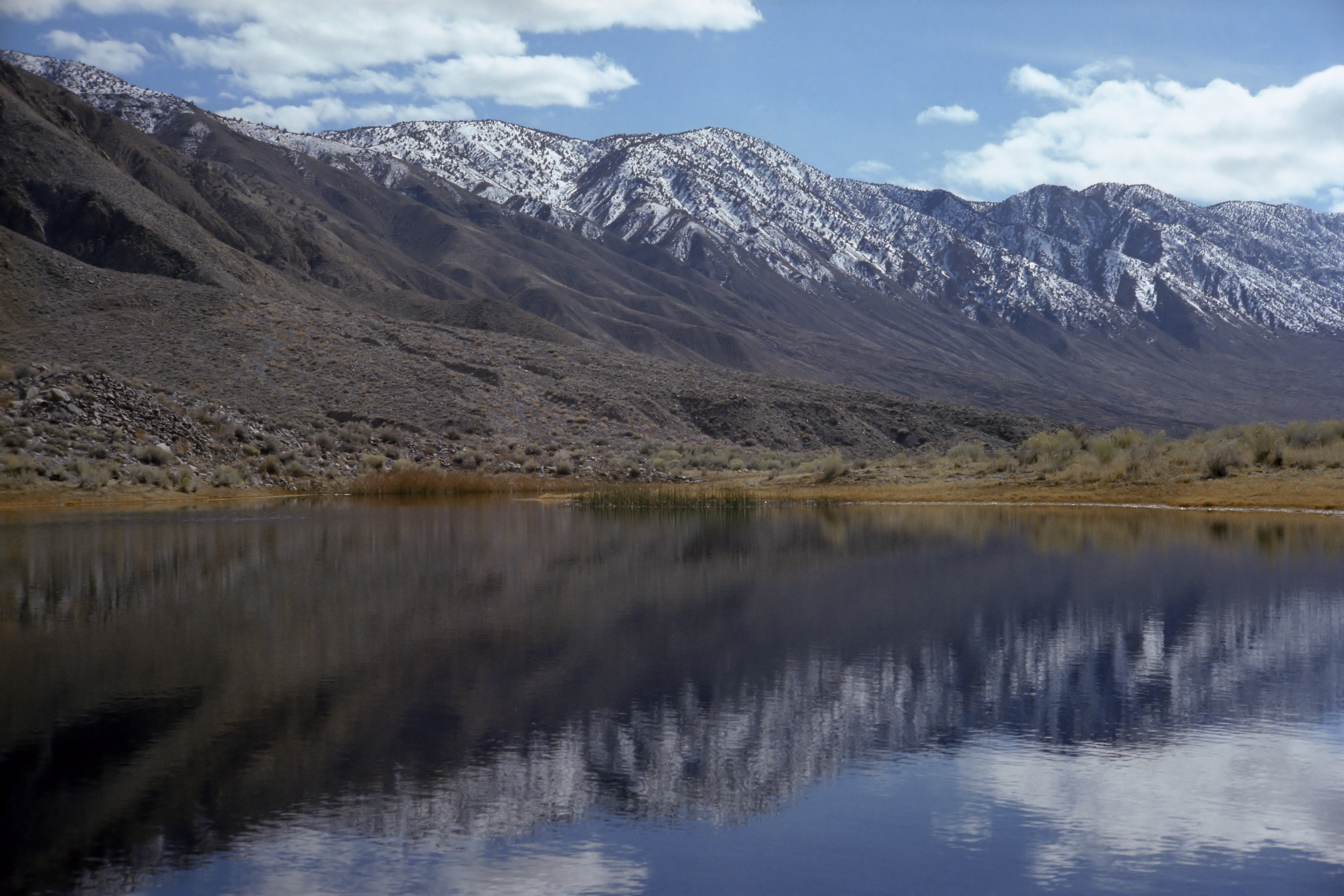
View of Deep Springs Lake

== History and natural resources ==
The lake within Deep Springs Valley, Deep Springs Lake, is also a rich source of evaporite minerals and mining material. However, Deep Springs Lake is under-utilized because nearby Owens Lake provides a more accessible source for mining.

The springs are used for irrigation for agricultural operations and livestock in the area. There are several levees and ditches surrounding the lake that are presumed to improve the quality of life for grazing livestock and wildlife. The majority of the agriculture in the area is done by the students of Deep Springs College. The natural springs are also the main source of drinking water for the local area and Deep Springs College to meet daily water consumption needs.

== Native people ==
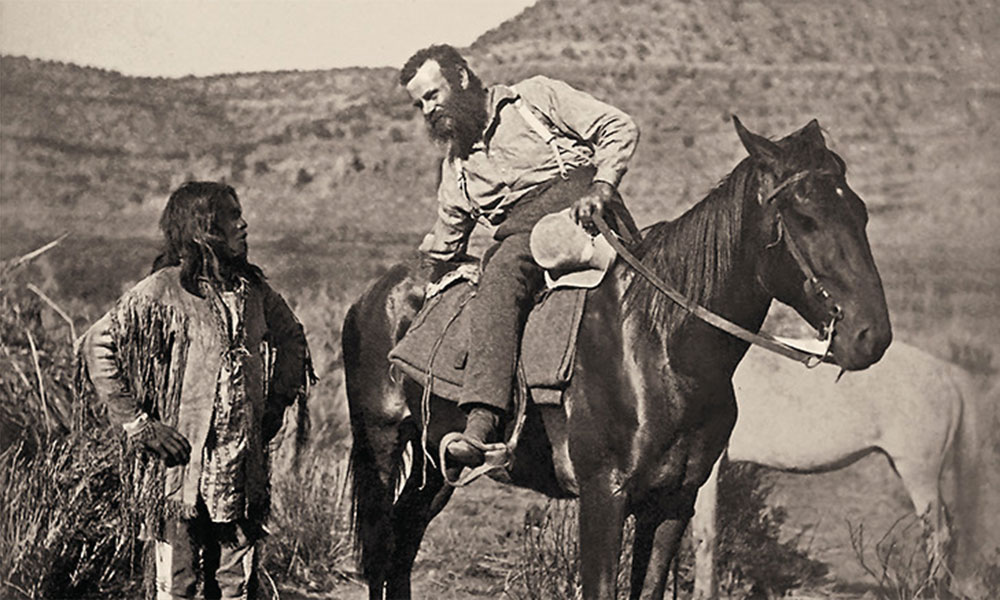
John Wesley Powell talking with Paiute Chief

For thousands of years, the Deep Springs Valley Paiute, a distinct subgroup of the Northern Paiute people, inhabited the area. They established traditional cultural practices and separated themselves from other Paiute groups in nearby Owens and Fish Lake valleys. Living in this remote and arid region, they adapted to the environment by developing an expansive knowledge of local plants, water sources, and hunting methods. They lived in the valley long before Euro-American settlers started to move into the area during the 20th century.

The Deep Springs Valley Paiute made use of a strategy called "annual round", where the movements and activities of a group of people were dependent upon seasonal availability of resources. During the fall and winter, they gather seeds, roots, and pine nuts, and hunt large game, including deer and mountain sheep. Survival involved their ability to adapt to the harsh environment and to efficiently exploit local resources. In particular, it was essential to their food supply that the pine nut harvest provided them with sustenance through the winter months.

== Wildlife ==
=== Notable animal life ===
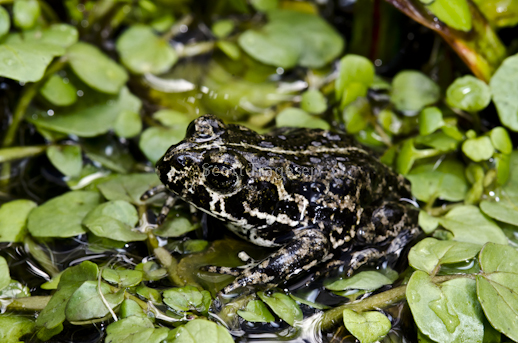
black toad

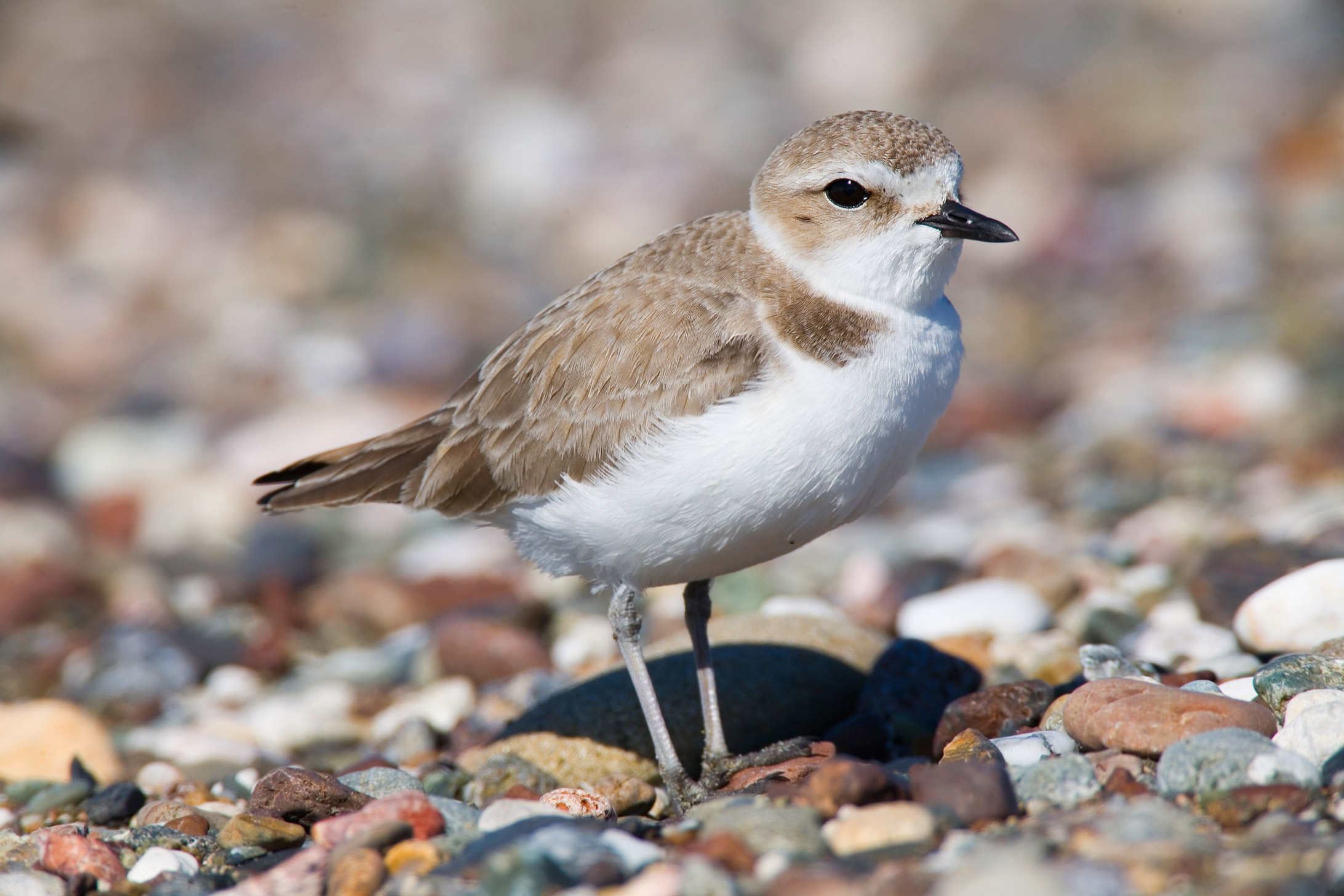
western snowy plover

Deep Springs Valley is specifically marked as an "Important Bird Area" by the Eastern Sierra Audubon Society however, the notable wildlife extends to amphibians, insects, and mammals as well. Some notable species include, the Western snowy plover (Charadrius alexandrinus nivosus) and the Black toad (Anaxyrus exsul). The black toad is only found within the Eastern Sierra region, at an estimated population of around 7800–9700. The Deep Springs Valley wetlands are surrounded by desert, making it impossible for the black toad and other native species that rely on water to expand beyond that area. As for the snowy plover and other migratory species, Deep Springs Valley provides a sanctuary of water and resources, as they begin flying south for the fall and winter months. The wetlands surrounding Deep Springs Lake as well as the marshier areas within the valley contribute to a more diverse ecosystem with an otherwise dry and arid climate.

=== Notable plant life ===
Deep Springs is also home to an assortment of plants. Around the main circle, there are lemon balm (Melissa officinalis) and mullein (Verbascum thapsus). In rocky areas, there are beavertail cactus (Opuntia basilaris), desert prince's-plume (Stanleya pinnata), and indigo bush (Psorothamnus arborescens var. minutifolius). On the dry valley floor, there is fourwing saltbush (Atriplex canescens) and hopsage (Grayia spinosa). On the wetter valley floor, there are rabbitbrush (Chrysothamnus greenei and viscidiflorus), antelope bitterbrush (Purshia tridentata var. glandulosa), and sagebrush (Artemisia tridentata ssp. tridentata).

== Climate ==
Deep Springs Valley has a semi-arid desert climate with hot, dry summers and cold, dry winters—very similar to surrounding areas.

In the summer, temperatures at the Deep Springs reach maximums around 91.8 °F (33.2 °C) and minimums around 54.1 °F (12.3 °C). In the winter, temperature maximums reach around 51.3 °F (10.7 °C) and minimums around 7.7 °F (−13.5 °C).

Year-round precipitation is sparse, with an annual total of 6.63 inches (16.8 cm). Despite the low precipitation, occasional summer thunderstorms sometimes bring brief rainfall.
