= Toronto Power Generating Station =

Abandoned power plant in Canada

Coordinates: 43.071997°N 79.0737°W

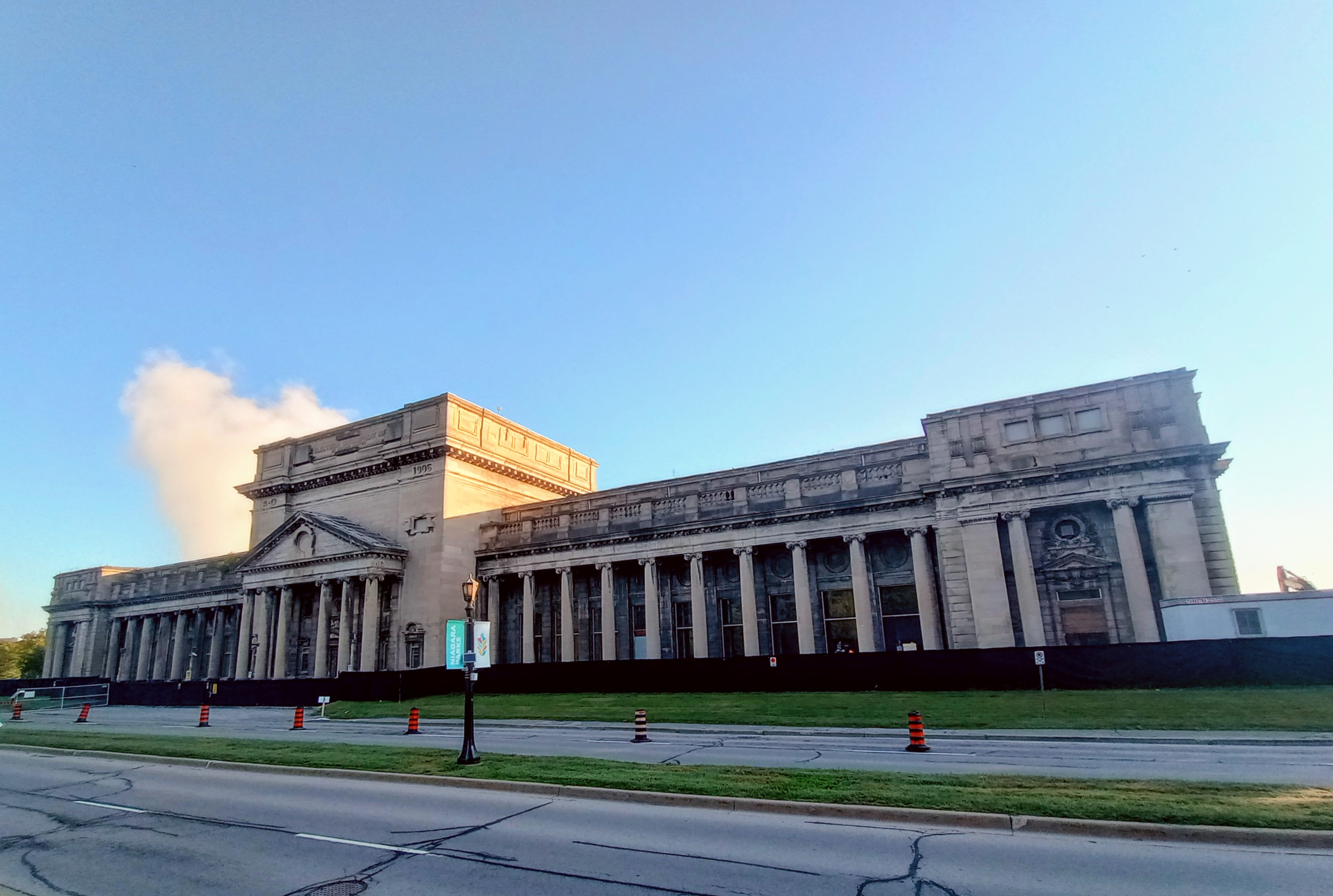
- Interactive map of Toronto Power Generating Station
- Location: Ontario, Canada
- Nearest city: Niagara Falls
- Built: 1906
- Original use: Hydro generating station
- Current use: None (vacant)
- Architect: E. J. Lennox
- Governing body: Niagara Parks Commission

National Historic Site of Canada
- Designated: 1983

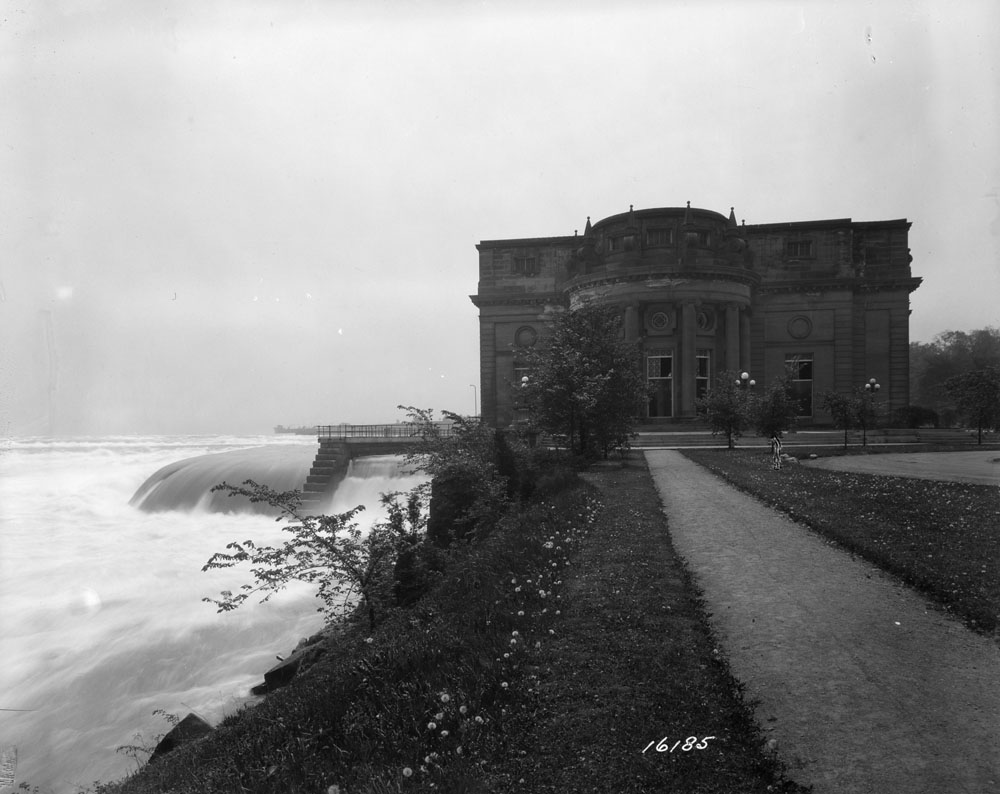
An early photograph of the station

The Toronto Power Generating Station is a former generating station located along the Niagara River in Niagara Falls, Ontario, Canada, slightly upstream from the newer Rankine Generating Station. Completed in 1906 in the Beaux-Arts-style, the station was designed by architect E. J. Lennox and was built by the Electrical Development Company of Ontario (owned by William Mackenzie, Frederic Thomas Nicholls, and Henry Mill Pellatt) under supervision of Hugh L. Cooper to supply hydro-electric power to nearby Toronto, Ontario.

The plant is built on top of a deep wheel pit, with turbines at the bottom of the pit, turning generators at the top by means of long vertical shafts. The water from the turbines runs out through a brick-lined tailrace which eventually comes out at the base of the falls. In its prime, it had a generating capacity of 137,500 horsepower (102,500 kW).

The plant ceased operations on February 15, 1974, as Ontario Hydro looked to make better use of the available water downriver at the Sir Adam Beck Hydroelectric Power Stations in Queenston. In addition, the plant produced electricity at a frequency of 25 Hertz, now largely unused. The vacant plant was designated a National Historic Site of Canada in 1983, due to its importance in the development of business, industry and technology in Ontario, its status as the first wholly Canadian-owned hydro-electric facility at Niagara Falls, and the unusual application of Beaux-Arts design to an industrial plant.

Ownership of the Toronto Power Generating Station was transferred to the Niagara Parks Commission in 2007. Structural assessments were subsequently undertaken in order to consider future adaptive reuse options for the facility. In its current empty state, the plant has been the subject of urban exploration activities.

As a result of a 2021 procurement process, the commission announced in 2024 a partnership with venue management company Pearle Hospitality and condo developer Society Developments to develop the station into a luxury hotel. Under the station will remain in the hands of Niagara Parks with Pearle Hospitality as a tenant, with developers will provide the $200 million investment. The opening of the new hotel is scheduled for 2027.

== See also ==
- Ontario Power Company Generating Station
- Rankine Generating Station
