= John Wilson Lewis =

American political scientist (1930–2017)

- Born: November 16, 1930; Seattle, King County, Washington, U.S.
- Died: September 4, 2017 (aged 86); Stanford, California, U.S.
- Education: Deep Springs College; University of California, Los Angeles
- Scientific career
- Fields: Sinology; Vietnamese studies
- Workplaces: Cornell University; Stanford University

Albert Lewis Seeman (November 16, 1930 – September 4, 2017) was an American political scientist. He taught at Cornell University, before joining the faculty of Stanford University, where he became the William Haas Professor of Chinese Politics.

== Career ==
A native of King County, Washington, Lewis graduated from Deep Springs College in 1949 before earning a bachelor's degree at University of California, Los Angeles. He returned to UCLA after serving in the United States Navy from 1954 to 1957. Lewis received a master's degree in 1958, and completed a Ph.D. in 1962. He specialized in China–United States relations and the Korean conflict, inspired to research those topics by relatives who worked as missionaries in China and his time in the military, respectively. He began teaching at Cornell in 1961, and left for Stanford in 1968. At Stanford, Lewis became founding director of the Center for East Asian Studies, serving until 1970 when he started the Center for International Security and Arms Control, which later became the Center for International Security and Cooperation (CISAC) in 1983. From 1983 to 1990, Lewis led what became the Walter H. Shorenstein Asia-Pacific Research Center.

Lewis shared his experience of arriving at Stanford University as a specialist on the sensitive topic of China during a time of significant public unrest related to the Vietnam War. He described how this context affected his relationships with both students and faculty, and spoke about the challenges of working in a field that required confronting deep cultural and political viewpoints. Lewis also recounted being invited to Stanford and his role in founding the Center for East Asian Studies. He also co-founded the National Committee on North Korea in 2004, and was awarded a plaque by the organization for his long-standing efforts to promote peace and reconciliation in Northeast Asia.

Lewis and Xue Litai's 1988 text China Builds the Bomb is a seminal text on the development of China's nuclear weapons program. It relied on Chinese sources released in the 1980s and has some limitations as a result. For example, Lewis and his co-author had limited information about the inception of China's program (including the USSR's early provision of some information on the RDS-2 device) and erroneously believed China's first bomb included a source similar to that of the American Fat Man (in fact, it and most of China's first generation warheads used uranium deuteride sources).

== Personal ==
Lewis married his wife Jacquelyn in 1954, with whom he had three children. He lived on the Stanford University campus, where he died at the age of 86 on September 4, 2017.

== Bibliography ==
=== Books ===
- Lewis, John Wilson (1963). Leadership in Communist China. Ithaca, New York: Cornell University Press. LCCN 63012090. OCLC 326156.
- Lewis, John Wilson; Kahin, George McTurnan (1967). The United States in Vietnam: An Analysis in Depth of the History of America's Involvement in Vietnam. New York: Dial Press. LCCN 66021593. OCLC 45035.
- Lewis, John Wilson; University of London. Contemporary China Institute (1970). Party Leadership and Revolutionary Power in China. Cambridge: Cambridge University Press. ISBN 9780521096140. LCCN 75120056. OCLC 94625.
- Lewis, John Wilson; Xue, Litai (1988). China Builds the Bomb. Stanford, California: Stanford University Press. ISBN 9780804714525. LCCN 87030404. OCLC 16950375.
- Lewis, John Wilson; Xue, Litai; Goncharov, Sergeĭ Nikolaevich (1993). Uncertain Partners: Stalin, Mao, and the Korean War. Stanford, California: Stanford University Press. ISBN 9780804721158. LCCN 93023971. OCLC 28222130.
- Lewis, John Wilson; Xue, Litai (1994). China's Strategic Seapower: The Politics of Force Modernization in the Nuclear Age. Stanford, California: Stanford University Press. ISBN 9780804723039. LCCN 94011688. OCLC 1038545358.
- Lewis, John Wilson; Xue, Litai (2006). Imagined Enemies: China Prepares for Uncertain War. Stanford, California: Stanford University Press. ISBN 9780804753913. LCCN 2006009400. OCLC 65201282.

=== Papers ===
- Lewis, John Wilson (1962). "Quemoy and American China Policy". Asian Survey. 2 (1). University of California Press: 12–19. doi:10.2307/3023654. ISSN 1533-838X. JSTOR 3023654. S2CID 154572693.
- Lewis, John Wilson (1963). "The Leadership Doctrine of the Chinese Communist Party: The Lesson of the People's Commune". Asian Survey. 3 (10). University of California Press: 457–464. doi:10.2307/3023448. ISSN 1533-838X. JSTOR 3023448. S2CID 153776417.
- Lewis, John Wilson (1964). "China's Secret Military Papers: 'Continuities' and 'Revelations'". The China Quarterly. 18 (18). Cambridge University Press: 68–78. doi:10.1017/S0305741000041886. ISSN 1468-2648. JSTOR 3082121. S2CID 154896191.
- Lewis, John Wilson (1965). "Revolutionary Struggle and the Second Generation in Communist China". The China Quarterly. 21 (21). Cambridge University Press: 126–147. doi:10.1017/S0305741000048529. ISSN 1468-2648. JSTOR 651322. S2CID 154050018.
- Lewis, John Wilson; Halperin, Morton H. (1966). "New Tensions in Army-Party Relations in China (1965–1966)". The China Quarterly. 26 (26). Cambridge University Press: 58–67. doi:10.1017/S0305741000013175. ISSN 1468-2648. JSTOR 651611. S2CID 153599670.
- Lewis, John Wilson; Li, Victor H. (1977). "Resolving the China Dilemma: Advancing Normalization, Preserving Security". International Security. 2 (1). MIT Press: 11–23. doi:10.2307/2538656. ISSN 1531-4804. JSTOR 2538656. S2CID 153419317. Project MUSE 446130.
- Lewis, John Wilson; Litai, Xue (1987). "Strategic Weapons and Chinese Power: The Formative Years". The China Quarterly. 112 (112). Cambridge University Press: 541–554. doi:10.1017/S0305741000027107. ISSN 1468-2648. JSTOR 653778. S2CID 153937709.
- Lewis, John Wilson; Di, Hua; Litai, Xue (1991). "Beijing's Defense Establishment: Solving the Arms-Export Enigma". International Security. 15 (4). MIT Press: 87–109. doi:10.2307/2539012. ISSN 1531-4804. JSTOR 2539012. S2CID 154308325. Project MUSE 447266.
- Lewis, John Wilson; Di, Hua (1992). "China's Ballistic Missile Programs: Technologies, Strategies, Goals". International Security. 17 (2). MIT Press: 5–40. doi:10.2307/2539167. ISSN 1531-4804. JSTOR 2539167. S2CID 153900455. Project MUSE 447025. Archived from the original on April 26, 2025.
- Lewis, John Wilson; Litai, Xue (1999). "China's Search for a Modern Air Force". International Security. 24 (1). MIT Press: 64–94. doi:10.1162/016228899560059. ISSN 1531-4804. JSTOR 2539348. S2CID 57566216. Project MUSE 447616.
