= Robley C. Williams =

American biophysicist and virologist (1908–1995)

Robley Cook Williams
- Born: October 13, 1908; Santa Rosa, California, United States
- Died: January 3, 1995 (aged 86)
- Education: Cornell University
- Known for: work with Tobacco mosaic virus
- Scientific career
- Workplaces: University of Michigan; University of California, Berkeley

Robley Cook Williams (October 13, 1908 – January 3, 1995) was an early biophysicist and virologist. He served as the first president of the Biophysical Society. He also served as the president of the Electron Microscope Society of America in 1951.

== Career ==
Williams attended Cornell University on an athletic scholarship, completing a B.S. in 1931 and a Ph.D. in physics in 1935. While at Cornell, he was selected for membership in the Telluride House and the Quill and Dagger society. Williams began his research career as an assistant professor of astronomy at the University of Michigan, and from 1945, associate professor of physics. A growing fascination with viruses led him to leave Michigan in 1950, when he was invited to the University of California, Berkeley by Wendell Stanley, to serve as a professor at the newly created Department of Virology.

== Research ==
Together with Heinz Fraenkel-Conrat, Williams studied the Tobacco mosaic virus, and showed that a functional virus could be created out of purified RNA and a protein coat. That same year, he was elected to the National Academy of Sciences. Williams was involved in the early use of electron micrography in biology. Working with Ralph Walter Graystone Wyckoff he helped develop a technique to take three-dimensional electron microscope images of bacteria using a "metal shadowing" technique. He also helped develop biophysical techniques such as freeze etching and particle-counting by the spray-drop technique.

== Personal ==
Williams son Robley C. Williams, Jr. is a professor emeritus of biological science at Vanderbilt University.

== Honors and awards ==
- 1939: Edward Longstreth Medal from the Franklin Institute.
