= Deep Springs College =

Private junior college in California

- Type: Private junior college
- Established: 1917
- Founder: L.L. Nunn
- Accreditation: ACCJC
- President: Thomas Cassidy
- Dean: Jeff Miller
- Total staff: 30 (approximate)
- Students: 29 (approximate)
- Location: Deep Springs, California, U.S. 37.3739°N 117.98°W
- Campus: Rural
- Website: deepsprings.edu
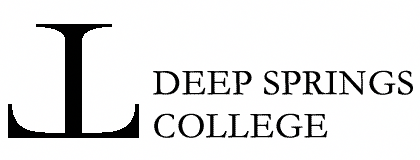

Deep Springs College (known simply as Deep Springs or DS) is a private junior college in Deep Springs, California. With the number of undergraduates restricted to 26, the college is one of the smallest institutions of higher education in the United States. (Note: In L. Jackson Newell's 1982 assessment of Deep Springs College, he states that it "ranks second among the nation's institutions of higher learning with respect to the aptitude of the students it admits".) Though it offers an associate degree, most students transfer into a four-year college after completing their studies. Those enrolled pay no tuition and are given room and board.

Founded in 1917 as Deep Springs Collegiate and Preparatory, it was originally a men's college backed by funding from L. L. Nunn, a lawyer and businessman. Nunn envisioned an unorthodox form of education that combined academic rigor, manual labor, and self-governance. Located in a geological depression, its campus is situated within a cattle ranch with the aim of providing a secluded environment away from urban life so undergraduates may focus on their studies and leadership ability. The college is primarily maintained and self-governed by students, becoming a coeducational institution in 2018.

The college's alumni include Rhodes and Truman Scholars, two Pulitzer Prize recipients, three MacArthur Fellows, and winners of an Emmy and Lawrence Award, among multiple academics and congressmen.

== History ==
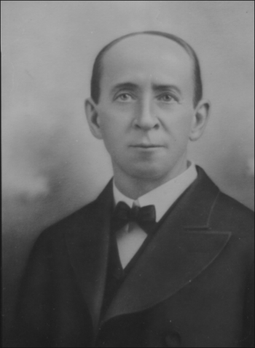
L. L. Nunn, a graduate of Harvard Law School, founded Deep Springs.

Deep Springs was founded in 1917 by L. L. Nunn, a business magnate who made his fortune building alternating current power plants in the Western United States. Nunn's first projects—a hydroelectric plant in Telluride, Colorado, and the Olmsted Power Station in Provo, Utah—served as the foundation for his inspiration to create a new type of educational institution. As it became difficult to find enough engineers capable of living under rough conditions, he began schooling local men and pursued an interest in education. Nunn eventually sold his industrial assets to fund the Telluride Association, an educational trust based at Cornell University, and the Telluride House. After becoming dissatisfied with the association's mission, he founded Deep Springs and helped in its administration until his death in 1925.

The establishment of Deep Springs was a reaction to what Nunn saw as a decline in academic standards in traditional American colleges. His philosophy governing Deep Springs focused strictly around the pursuit of "academics, labor, and self-governance", something he dubbed the "three pillars" which supported the "whole man". The inclusion of manual labor in a college's educational program was unusual in 1917, but a number of so-called manual labor colleges had existed in the United States in the 19th century—including, at one time, Oberlin College, which Nunn attended. By the early 1860s, most had either closed or had abandoned their manual labor programs.

Nunn's pillars entailed students playing an active role in the administration of the college by laboring in the field and contributing to student meetings during committees, which Nunn believed was an effective method of producing "leaders for a democratic society". To this end, the board of trustees, which Nunn established to preserve the college's traditions, contained one—later two—seats that were reserved for student trustees, who were elected by the student body and currently remain with full voice and voting rights. Due to his correspondence with these early student bodies, Nunn decided the college would provide student housing and would not include a tuition.

In the 1990s, the school's leadership debated transitioning the college to be coeducational. Whereas many women in the Telluride Association advocated for the change, a large portion of the school's alumni wished to keep its status as a men's college. Though the board of Deep Springs voted against making any change in 1994, in 1998 the college accepted a $1.8 million low-interest loan from Telluride under the condition that Deep Springs would begin admitting women by 2019. In 2011, the college's trustees voted to begin accepting female students in the summer of 2013 but became embroiled in legal challenges which were lodged against the trustees' action. The challengers disputed the authority of the college's board to change the admissions policy and included an injunction preventing the college from accepting female students until at least the 2018–2019 academic year. On April 13, 2017, the California Court of Appeal ruled that the college could admit women in Hitz v. Hoekstra. With the Supreme Court of California declining to hear an appeal, the board of trustees voted once again to admit women, with the first female students arriving in July 2018.

== Curriculum ==
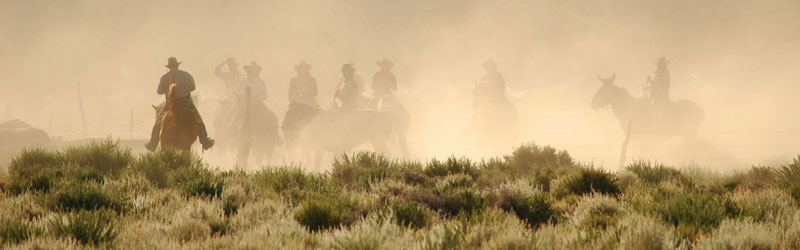
Deep Springs students and staff moving cattle

Deep Springs involves students working on tasks in the on-campus ranch, farm, and boarding house, including "cooking, cleaning, gardening, milking cows, saddling horses, herding cattle, moving hay, butchering chickens, wiring cables, sorting library books, and fixing vehicles" with the academic curriculum dedicated wholly to the liberal arts such as Ancient Greek, philosophy, political science, and literature. Classes are taught by a long-term faculty—the president, dean, and chairs of the natural science and humanities department—and a division of visiting professors and scholars which make up the short-term faculty, neither of which may hold tenure at the College proper. Undergraduates work a minimum of 20 hours a week, rotating tasks while also studying for their classes.

Students attend classes during the morning and spend the afternoon working on the ranch. Though the majority of learning is cooperatively determined between professors and students, taking the form of both in-class seminars and outside of the classroom reading groups and discussions, there are two required courses: freshman composition and public speaking. After graduation, approximately two-thirds of the student body transfer to an Ivy League university or another similarly ranked institution, with a substantial portion going on to attend Cornell University, Brown University or the University of California, Berkeley.

== Campus ==
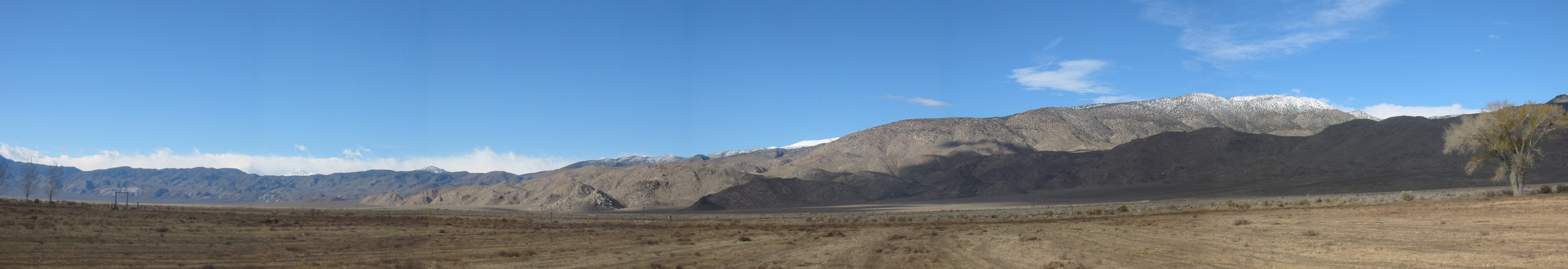
View from main ranch to Deep Springs Valley

Deep Springs College is isolated within Deep Springs Valley, a geological depression between the White and Inyo mountain ranges, with the nearest sizable town being Bishop, California, and the closest commercial airport being in Las Vegas. With the college's campus consisting primarily of its 32,000-acre (13,000 ha) ranch, its physical isolation plays a central role in the educational experience. The college also contains a bookstore, post office, and a library, all maintained by students. Partly due to Nunn's previous experience closing down a school in Virginia due to students deserting campus, the school's "isolation policy" forbids students from leaving the college's campus and prohibits the use of alcohol.

Deep Springs used to have a direct telephone line crossing the White Mountains, but difficult maintenance made service unsustainable. The line was replaced in the 1980s by a wireless radio link connecting to the Bishop central office. Because the radio signal is relayed using a repeater station high in the White Mountains, and because the first relay out of Deep Springs Valley does not have line of sight, the system is subject to outages caused by high winds and inclement weather. Previously, the college's Internet connection was an unusually slow 14.4 kbit/s data channel multiplexed into the radio link. Not later than 2011, the college connected to the internet by satellite. Deep Springs has an FM radio-based Voice over Internet Protocol phone system, and direct inward dialing.

A small seismic station exists behind the main campus, installed by the former Soviet Union as part of a bi-national underground nuclear test monitoring agreement.

== Alumni ==
Despite the small number of admitted students, Deep Springs disproportionately produces members of academia with the majority of graduates going on to receive doctorates. Alumni include multiple scholars, professors, authors, scientists, and members of government. The college's alumni have been awarded Rhodes and Truman Scholarships, three MacArthur "genius grants", five memberships to the National Academy of Sciences, two Pulitzer Prizes, one Emmy award, and one E. O. Lawrence Award, among other honors. Prominent alumni include:

- Robert B. Aird, neurologist
- Nathaniel Borenstein, computer scientist
- Baird Bryant, filmmaker
- Albert Bush-Brown, architectural historian and former President of RISD
- Barney Childs, composer and Rhodes Scholar
- Charles Collingwood, journalist and Rhodes Scholar
- Edwin Cronk, U.S. ambassador to Singapore
- John D'Agata, essayist
- Norton Dodge, economist, aided Soviet dissidents by secretly smuggling over 20,000 works of protest art from Soviet Russia
- Sean Eldridge, American political activist and former congressional candidate
- Thomas E. Fairchild, Wisconsin Attorney General and U.S. Court of Appeals judge
- Glen Fukushima, businessman and public servant
- Newton Garver, philosopher and peace activist
- Robert F. Gatje, architect and author
- Philip S. Gorski, sociologist at Yale University
- Philip Hanawalt, biologist and member of the National Academy of Sciences
- David Hitz, computer engineer and co-founder of NetApp
- Kinch Hoekstra, political and legal theorist
- Park Honan, biographer
- Raymond B. Huey, evolutionary biologist and member of the National Academy of Sciences
- Raymond Jeanloz, geophysicist, MacArthur fellow, and member of the National Academy of Sciences
- Philip Kennicott, Pulitzer Prize-winning journalist
- Andy Kim, U.S. Senator, Rhodes Scholar and Truman Scholar
- Benjamin Kunkel, novelist, founder of n+1 magazine
- John Wilson Lewis, political scientist
- William A. Masters, food economist
- Zachary Mider, Pulitzer Prize-winning journalist
- Erik Mueggler, sinologist and MacArthur fellow
- John Niederhauser, agricultural scientist
- Jim Olin, U.S. Congressman
- John W. Olmsted, historian, professor emeritus at University of California, Riverside and Rhodes Scholar
- Vern Penner, U.S. Ambassador to Cape Verde
- Michael Putney, Emmy Award-winning television reporter
- Herbert Reich, electrical engineer and inventor
- Damon Rich, urban planner and MacArthur fellow
- Peter Rock, novelist
- Gerard Saucier, professor of psychology at the University of Oregon
- Gus Simmons, mathematician and cryptographer, E. O. Lawrence award winner
- G. William Skinner, anthropologist and member of the National Academy of Sciences
- Shepard M. Smith, NOAA officer
- Robert Sproull, physicist and educator
- Julian Steward, anthropologist and member of the National Academy of Sciences
- William L. Sullivan, author of outdoor guide books
- Oscar Tuazon, artist
- William vanden Heuvel, diplomat
- William T. Vollmann, novelist
- Graeme Wood, journalist

== See also ==
- Work college
