= Shepard M. Smith =

Rear admiral in the NOAA Commissioned Officer Corps

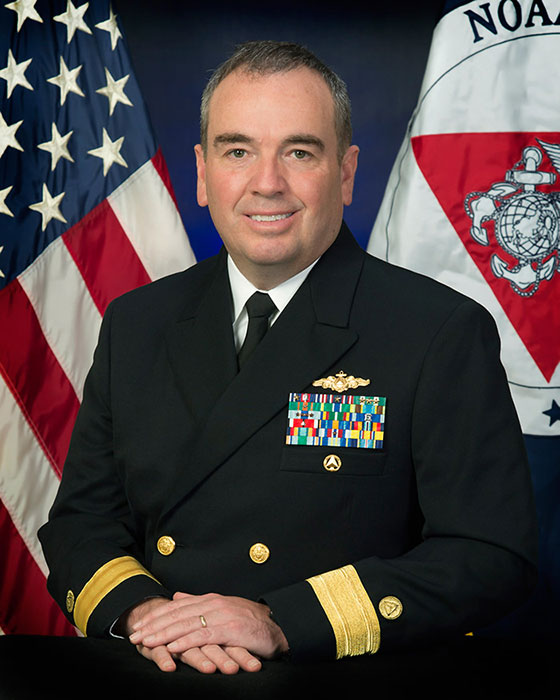
- Alma mater: Deep Springs College; Cornell University; University of New Hampshire
- Military career
- Allegiance: United States of America
- Branch: NOAA Commissioned Officer Corps
- Service years: 1993–2021
- Rank: Rear admiral (lower half)
- Commands: Director, Office of Coast Survey; Deputy Director, NOAA Office of Marine and Aviation Operations
- Awards: Department of Commerce Gold Medal; Department of Commerce Bronze Medal

Shepard M. Smith is a former rear admiral in the NOAA Commissioned Officer Corps who last served as the director of the Office of Coast Survey. He concurrently served as a member of the Mississippi River Commission and as the chair of the International Hydrographic Organization’s Council. He retired from the NOAA Corps in April 2021.

== Early life ==
Smith holds a bachelor of science degree in mechanical engineering from Cornell University and earned a master of science degree in ocean engineering from the University of New Hampshire. He received a direct commission to the rank of ensign in the NOAA Corps in 1993.

== Career ==
Smith is the 30th leader of the Office of Coast Survey since the first superintendent, Ferdinand R. Hassler, was appointed in 1816. As director, Smith is dedicated to advancing the Coast Survey initiatives of modernizing digital charting, increasing use of autonomous systems for hydrography, and improved integrated navigation services for seaports.

Rear Adm. Smith serves as a presidentially-appointed member of the Mississippi River Commission that oversees navigation and flood control projects on the largest river system in the United States. Smith also serves as the chair of the International Hydrographic Organization’s (IHO) Council that comprises 30 leading IHO member nations and oversees performance management and the business side of the IHO.

Hallmarks of Smith’s career have been his leadership in the modernization of NOAA’s charting systems and transformation of NOAA’s hydrographic technologies. That leadership and experience expands Coast Survey’s data capabilities and supports a data-enabled maritime economy, among other challenges. Smith was commanding officer of NOAAS Thomas Jefferson, on which he served three tours during his NOAA career. During his latest tour, Smith became NOAA’s first commanding officer to operationalize autonomous surface vehicles for mapping shallow areas previously inaccessible and uncharted. While chief of Coast Survey’s Marine Chart Division, he changed the nation’s charting tradition, established in the 19th century, by restructuring chart production and distribution. This modernization makes U.S. navigational data more accessible to the public through a wider range of electronic formats.

== Education ==
- Deep Springs College
- B.A. in Mechanical Engineering at the Cornell University
- M.S. in Ocean Engineering at University of New Hampshire

== Awards ==
- Department of Commerce Bronze Medal (2005)
- Department of Commerce Gold Medal (2020)
