= Albert Bush-Brown =

American art historian (1926–1994)

Albert Bush-Brown (1926–1994) was an American architectural historian and university president. He was chancellor and president of Long Island University (1971–1985) and president of Rhode Island School of Design (1962–1968) He also taught art history at Princeton, Harvard, Case Western Reserve, and Massachusetts Institute of Technology.

He authored several books, including Louis Sullivan (1960) and The Architecture of America: A Social Interpretation (1961).

He attended Princeton University and Deep Springs College.
