= Kinch Hoekstra =

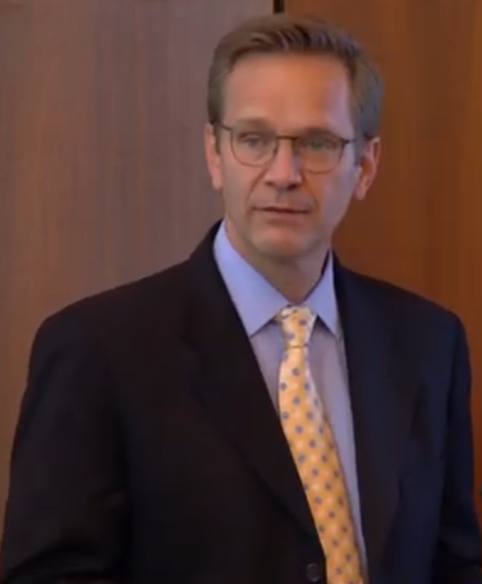

Academic background
- Education: Deep Springs College; Brown University; University of Oxford

Kinch J. Hoekstra is an American legal scholar and academic whose work concerns the history of political, moral, and legal thought. He is Chancellor's Professor of Political Science and Law and Affiliated Professor of Philosophy and Classics at the University of California, Berkeley. He is also Faculty Director of the Kadish Center for Morality, Law and Public Affairs at the UC Berkeley School of Law. Hoekstra has held visiting positions, lectureships, and fellowships at the University of Oxford, Princeton University, Boston University, and the Institute for Advanced Study.

== Education ==
Hoekstra attended Deep Springs College, later transferring to Brown University. He graduated from Brown in 1987 with a Bachelor of Arts. Hoekstra studied philosophy at the University of Oxford on a Marshall Scholarship, receiving a doctorate from the university in 1998.

== Career ==
Hoekstra has taught at the University of California, Berkeley since 2008.

From 2004 to 2005, Hoekstra was a member of the School of Historical Studies at the Institute for Advanced Study in Princeton, New Jersey. He served as a visiting faculty fellow at Princeton University's University Center for Human Values from 2011 to 2012. In 2017, he was the Carlyle Lecturer in the History of Political Thought at the University of Oxford and Visiting Professorial Fellow at Nuffield College. In 2023 he was a Visiting Fellow of All Souls College, Oxford.

Hoekstra was a trustee of Deep Springs College.
