= William L. Sullivan (author) =

American writer (born 1953)

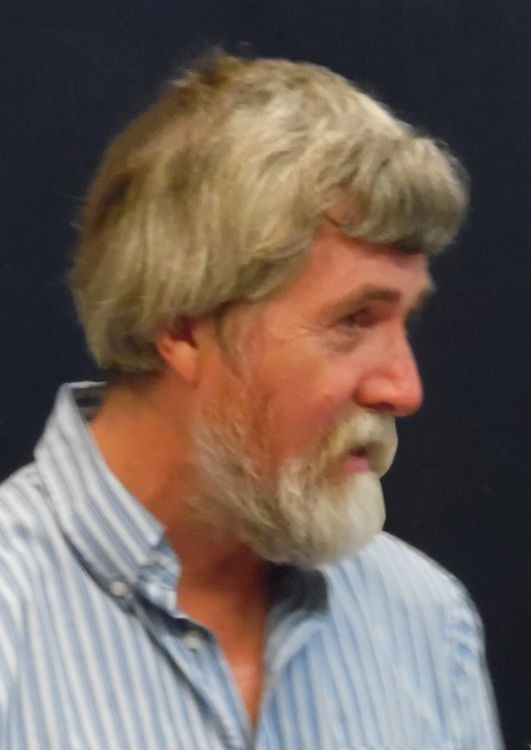
- Sullivan in 2015
- Born: 9 April 1953 (age 73); Salem, Oregon, U.S.
- Education: Deep Springs College; Cornell University (BA); Heidelberg University; University of Oregon (MA)
- Occupation: Author
- Partner: Janell Sorensen
- Writing career
- Genres: Outdoor guidebooks; history; fiction
- Subject: Oregon
- Notable works: Listening for Coyote; Hiking Oregon's History; Oregon "100 hikes" trail guide series
- Notable awards: Oregon Book Award finalist, 1989; University of Oregon Outstanding Service to Oregon Award, 2014

William Lawrence Sullivan (born 9 April 1953) is an American author of outdoor guide books, histories, and fiction. He has written over twenty books, almost all of them related in some way to his home state of Oregon. Before he began his writing career, he attended several colleges, earning degrees from Cornell University and the University of Oregon. His "100 hikes" guide book series is especially popular with people who enjoy backpacking in Oregon's wilderness areas. In 2005, the Oregon Cultural Heritage Commission selected one of his books, Listening for Coyote, as one of the 100 most significant books in Oregon history.

== Biography ==
Sullivan is a fifth-generation Oregonian. He was born on 9 April 1953 in Salem, Oregon. His father, J. Wesley Sullivan, was the editor of the Statesman Journal newspapers. His father was also a life-long advocate of wilderness conservation, which helped nurture his son's interest in the outdoors. Sullivan grew up in Salem and attended South Salem High School.

When he was 17 years old, Sullivan won a scholarship to study at Deep Springs College in a remote desert area of Inyo County, California. He went on to Cornell University, where he graduated with a Bachelor of Arts degree in English. Sullivan then attended Heidelberg University, where he studied linguistics for two years. When he returned from Heidelberg, Sullivan enrolled in the University of Oregon and received a Master of Arts degree in German literature in 1979.

Today, Sullivan lives in Eugene, Oregon with his wife, Janell Sorensen. They spend their summers in a log cabin they built in an isolated area along the Siletz River in the Oregon Coast Range. Sullivan does much of his writing at the cabin. He hikes and travels for enjoyment as well as for book research. His other hobbies include cross-country skiing and reading foreign language novels. He also plays the pipe organ and harpsichord.

Sullivan is an advocate for libraries. He served as president of the Lane (County) Library League and helped the Eugene Public Library Foundation raise $18 million for a new library which opened in 2002. He was also a member of the Oregon State Library Board from 2000 to 2008. As a member of that state board, he helped oversee the Oregon State Library system. He has also been a member of the Round Table Club of Eugene since 2005, serving as president of the organization in 2010.

In 2014, the University of Oregon presented Sullivan with its Outstanding Service to Oregon Award. The award recognized Sullivan's contributions to the quality of life in Oregon. The university highlighted his well-known hiking guide books and other writings along with his civic leadership, support of libraries and literacy, and environmental advocacy in his award citation.

== Outdoor enthusiast ==
Sullivan started hiking when he was five years old. Since then, he has never stopped exploring Oregon's wilderness and backcountry trails. In 1985, Sullivan decided to backpack across Oregon. He started at Cape Blanco, the state's westernmost point of land. His adventure took two-months and covered over 1,300 miles (2,100 km), before finishing at Hells Canyon on the state's eastern border. The journal he kept while on his trek became the basis for his book, Listening for Coyote.

Over the years, Sullivan has hiked the full length of most public trail in Oregon. He used his outdoor experiences as the basis for his numerous hiking guides including his five-book "100 hikes" series. Today, he continues to travel throughout Oregon to keep his guide books current. During his frequent wilderness trips, he updates trail and destination information for new editions of his books.

As a dedicated outdoorsman, Sullivan is an active member of Oregon Wild, an Oregon conservation group formerly known as the Oregon Natural Resources Council. He also served as a member of that organization's board of directors. Sullivan is a well-known guest lecturer on Oregon history, backpacking, and wilderness conservation related subjects. In most years, he meets with approximately 5,000 people during his lecture tours that promote his books. His presentations include a history talks titled "Oregon for the Curious" and "Hiking Oregon's History" as well as lectures on Oregon's parks and wilderness areas.

== Books ==
As of 2016, Sullivan has written over twenty books along with numerous articles about Oregon. His articles include a feature column called "Oregon Trails" that is published in two newspapers, Eugene's Register-Guard and Salem's Statesman-Journal.

Sullivan's first notable book, Listening for Coyote, was initially published in 1988. It tells the story of Sullivan's 1,300 miles (2,100 km) hiking adventure through Oregon's wilderness backcountry. The book was an Oregon Book Award creative non-fiction finalist in 1989. In 2005, the Oregon Cultural Heritage Commission selected the book as one of the 100 most significant books in Oregon's history.

Exploring Oregon's Wild Areas was published in 1994. However, Sullivan had problems with the publishing companies. As a result, he founded his own publishing company, Navillus Press. Sullivan published Hiking Oregon's History in 1999. The book combines Oregon history with related trail hikes to highlight some of the state's most interesting and scenic sites. His next book, A Deeper Wild, was a fiction book about the life of Joaquin Miller. By the time A Deeper Wild was being published, Sullivan was selling about 16,000 books each year.

The following year, Sullivan began publishing his hiking guides. The first was titled Oregon Trips and Trails. The book highlighted 100 Oregon outdoor destinations and included 800 maps and photographs. That same year, he published his first "100 hikes" guide book, based Oregon's regions. 100 Hikes in Southern Oregon was followed by 100 Hikes in the Central Oregon Cascades in 2005, 100 Hikes in Northwest Oregon and Southwest Washington in 2006, 100 Hikes/Travel Guide: Eastern Oregon in 2008, and 100 Hikes/Travel Guide: Oregon Coast and Coast Range in 2009. In 2010, he produced a hiking guide for two of Oregon's national parks. The book was titled Trails of Crater Lake National Park and Oregon Caves National Monument. In 2011, Oregon Favorites: Trails and Tales was published. All of his hiking guides include information on local history, geology, flora, and fauna as well as detailed trail maps, area photographs, and directions. Sullivan continues to update his hiking guides every few years. To help ensure his guides stay current, he offers a free copy for anyone who finds an error in one of his guide books.

During this same period, Sullivan also published Cabin Fever: Notes from a part-time pioneer. A book about how Sullivan built a cabin in a remote area of the Oregon Coast Range using pioneer tools and building techniques. In 2007, he published a mystery story titled The Case of Einstein's Violin. The next year, Sullivan published a history of Oregon's most significant natural disasters. Oregon's Greatest Natural Disasters documented major fires, floods, earthquakes, tsunamis, and volcanic eruptions that impacted Oregon during the past 13,000 years. He also published two Oregon atlases, Oregon: Pacific Coast to Wallowa Mountains in 2008 and Atlas of Oregon Wilderness in 2009.

In 2011, Sullivan published The Ship in the Hill. The book is a work of fiction about Vikings. A year later, he wrote a fictional account of the D.B. Cooper aircraft hijacking. Sullivan's most recent book was published in 2014. It is a collection of short stories, entitled Oregon Variations: Stories. The book includes at least one story from every county in Oregon.

Most of his books were published by Navillus Press, a publishing company owed by Sullivan. Here is a list of his published books as of 2016:

- Build your own carts & wagons: 15 plans & projects, Tab Books (1983), ISBN 9780830611515
- Listening for Coyote: A walk across Oregon's wilderness, William Morrow and Company (1988), ISBN 9780688078805
- Exploring Oregon's Wild Areas, Mountaineers Books (1994), ISBN 9780898863864
- Hiking Oregon's History: The stories behind historic places you can walk to see, Navillus Press (1999), ISBN 9780961815271
- A Deeper Wild, Navillus Press (2000), ISBN 9780967783000
- Oregon Road Map & Travel Guide, Navillus Press (2003), ISBN 9780966534504
- Oregon Trips and Trails, Navillus Press (2003), ISBN 9780967783031
- 100 Hikes in Southern Oregon, Navillus Press (2003), ISBN 9780967783048
- Cabin Fever: Notes from a part-time pioneer, Navillus Press (2004), ISBN 9780967783055
- 100 Hikes in the Central Oregon Cascades, Navillus Press (2005), ISBN 9780967783062
- 100 Hikes in Northwest Oregon and Southwest Washington, Navillus Press (2006), ISBN 9780967783079
- The Case of Einstein's Violin, Navillus Press (2007), ISBN 9780967783086
- Oregon's Greatest Natural Disasters, Navillus Press (2008), ISBN 9780981570105
- Oregon: Pacific Coast to Wallowa Mountains, USA, Imus Geographics (2008), ISBN 9780966534535
- 100 Hikes/Travel Guide: Eastern Oregon, Navillus Press (2008), ISBN 9780967783093
- Atlas of Oregon Wilderness, Navillus Press (2009), ISBN 9780981570129
- 100 Hikes/Travel Guide: Oregon Coast and Coast Range, Navillus Press (2009), ISBN 9780981570112
- Trails of Crater Lake National Park & Oregon Caves National Monument, Navillus Press (2010), ISBN 9780981570150
- The Ship in the Hill, Navillus Press (2011), ISBN 9781452419640
- Oregon Favorites: Trails and Tales, Navillus Press (2011), ISBN 9780981570167
- The Case of D.B. Cooper's Parachute, Navillus Press (2012), ISBN 9780981570181
- Oregon Variations: Stories, Navillus Press (2014), ISBN 9781939312044
