= Newton Garver =

American philosopher

- Born: April 24, 1928
- Died: February 8, 2014 (aged 85)
- Spouse: Anneliese Garver (nee Sprecher)

Academic background
- Education: Deep Springs College; Swarthmore College (BA); University of Oxford; Cornell University (PhD)
- Thesis: Grammar and Criteria (1965)

Academic work
- Discipline: Philosophy
- Institutions: University at Buffalo

Newton Garver (April 24, 1928 – February 8, 2014) was an American philosopher and Professor of Philosophy at University at Buffalo. He is known for his works on Wittgenstein.

== Books ==
- Derrida & Wittgenstein
- This Complicated Form of Life
- Limits to Power: Some Friendly Reminders
- Nonviolence and community: Reflections on the Alternatives to Violence Project
- Jesus, Jefferson, and the Task of Friends
- Wittgenstein and approaches to clarity
