= Ontario Power Company Generating Station =

Canadian hydro-electric generating station

Coordinates: 43.08240°N 79.07737°W

The Ontario Power Company Generating Station is a former generating station located along the Niagara River in Niagara Falls, Ontario, Canada, just below the Horseshoe Falls.

== Background ==
In 1890, the US Niagara Falls Hydraulic Power and Manufacturing Company and its subsidiary Cataract Company formed the International Niagara Commission composed of experts, to analyze proposals to harness Niagara Falls on the US/Canada border to generate power. They settled on alternating current, or AC, electricity as being the preferred transmission method and, after going through many proposals. In 1893, they awarded the generating contract to Westinghouse Electric with further transmission lines and transformer contracts awarded to General Electric. Work began in 1893 and in November 1896, power generated from Niagara Falls at the Edward Dean Adams Power Plant was being sent to Buffalo, New York as well as the Niagara Falls plants of the Pittsburgh Reduction Company which needed large quantities of cheap electricity for smelting aluminum.

== Ontario Power Company ==
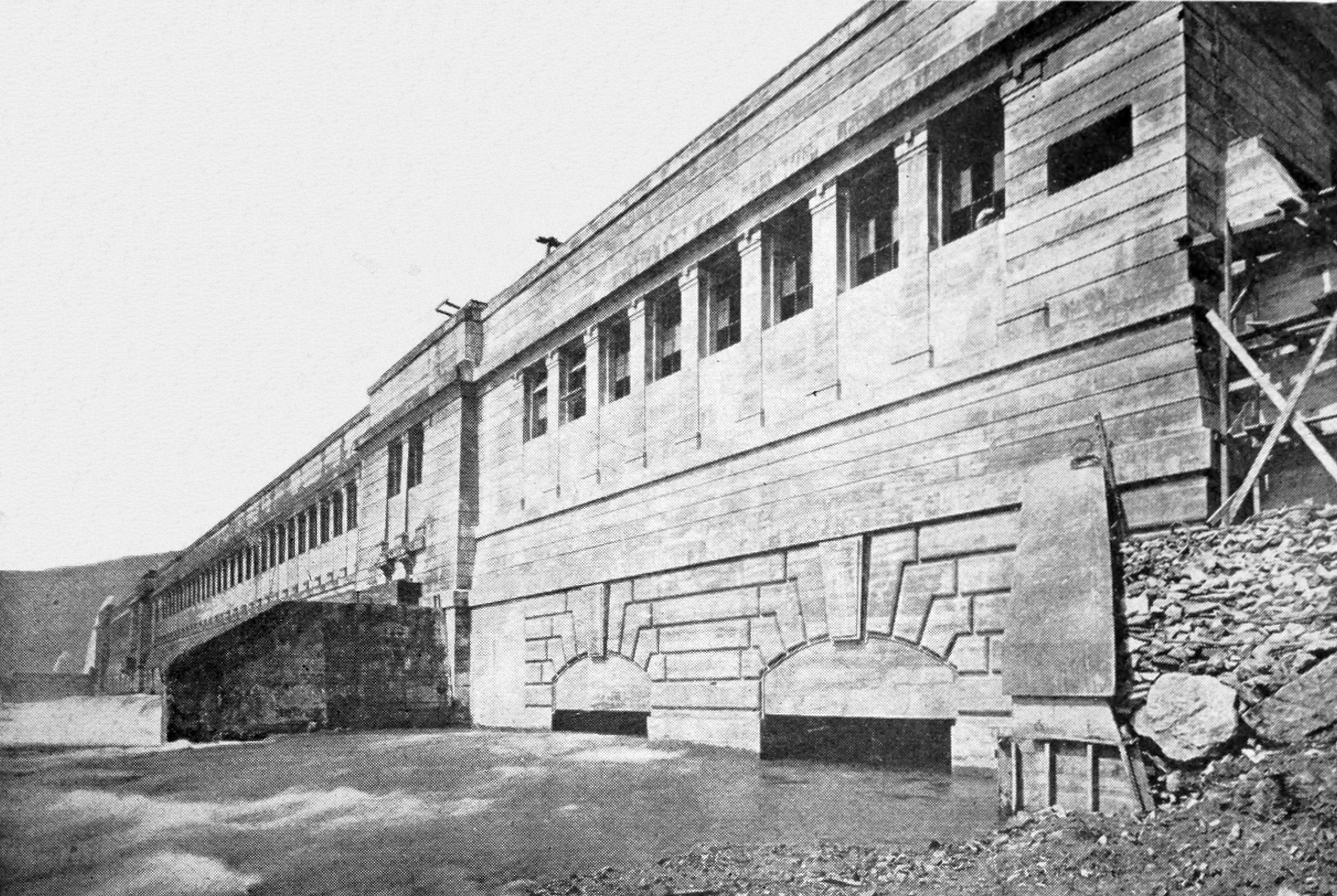
Generating station, 1919

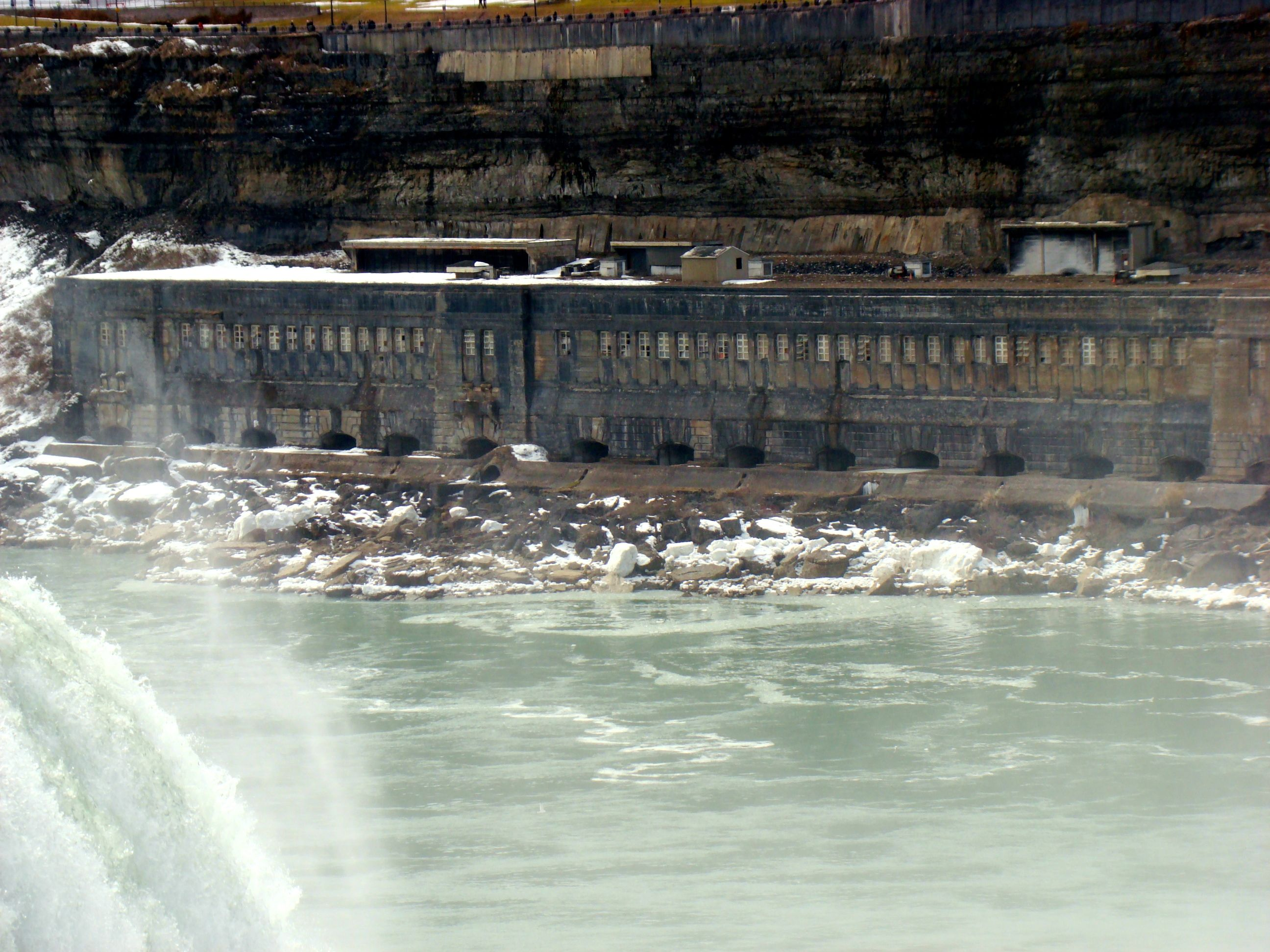
Ontario Power Company Generating Station

A similar set of events were happening on the Canadian side of the falls. In June 1887, recognizing an opportunity, the Ontario Power Company of Niagara Falls was incorporated in Canada “to supply manufacturers, corporations, and persons with water, hydraulic, electric or other power.” While its operations were in Queen Victoria Park in Niagara Falls, Ontario, its executive office was in Buffalo with the following officers: John J. Albright, president; Francis V. Greene, vice-president; and Robert C. Board, secretary and treasurer.

In 1903, the Company obtained an agreement with the Commissioners of the Queen Victoria Niagara Falls Park that allowed the company to develop at least 180,000 horsepower (130 MW) of electricity. The company built its hydroelectric generating plant, which opened in 1905, at the base of the Horseshoe Falls just above river level. The plant had 15 generators, which produced 203,000 horsepower (151 MW) of electric power, and was designed and built by L.L. Nunn. In 1904, Albright hired Buffalo architect E. B. Green to design the Beaux-Arts Ontario Power Company buildings, Murray Street at Buchanan Avenue, including the Entrance Pavilion, Spillway Building, Office & Transformer Station, Gate House, Screen House, and ‘’Ontario Power Company Generating Station’’ at river level.

The hydroelectric generating plant worked by allowing water to enter the generating station from an inlet located one mile (1,600 m) upstream of Niagara Falls, near the Dufferin Islands, which was then brought to the plant through buried conduit pipes and steel penstocks tunnelled through the rock. The conduits, two steel and one wooden (bound with iron hoops and encased in cement), ran underground 6,180 feet (1,880 meters) to the top of the generating station. There, each conduit connected with six penstocks, six feet (1.8 m) in diameter. At the point where the conduits and the penstocks join, there was a section which turned upwards into a spillway, called a surge tank. The surge tanks served to reduce fluctuations in heat and pressure during both the increase and decrease of loads. The open spillways sent any excess water to the Niagara River if the load suddenly reduced, which prevented any unwanted rise in pressure.

From the distributing station, the transmission lines carried power at 60,000 volts each with a capacity of 40,000 kilowatts, running over a right of way that was 300 feet (91 m) wide and 32,000 feet (9,800 m) long. This ran north to an area down the Niagara River known as Devil's Hole, where they then crossed the Niagara River into New York State across a 1,300-foot-long (396 m) span. In addition to the high-tension feeders, there were approximately 30 miles (48 km) of lines serving Canadian customers at generator voltage.

The power that was transmitted to New York State was then sold in bulk to Niagara Lockport and Ontario Power Company, a New York company, which was then distributed to individual customers. The largest individual consumers of power from these lines included several entities with direct ties to Albright: The Lackawanna Steel Company, Empire State Railway, New York Central Railroad, the Shenandoah Steel Wire Company, the Syracuse Rapid Transit Railway Company, the Lockport Gas and Electric Light Company, the Auburn Light Heat and Power Company, the Erie Railroad Company, and the Genesee County Electric Light Power and Gas Company.

== Provincial acquisition and decommissioning ==
The Hydro-Electric Power Commission of Ontario acquired the generating station in 1917.

The plant was upgraded from 25 Hz to 60 Hz power under the supervision of Roy F. Potvin from 1972 through to 1976. The plant continued to operate until 1999 when Ontario Power Generation (formerly Ontario Hydro) decommissioned the Ontario Power Company Generating Station from service in order to accommodate the construction of Niagara Fallsview Casino Resort, built on the former transformer building location.

As of 2015, the 1905 Generating Station along the Niagara River edge is owned by the Niagara Parks Commission, and sits abandoned.

== See also ==
- Rankine Generating Station
- Toronto Power Generating Station
