= Joseph M. Schwartz =

American academic (b. 1954)

Joseph M. Schwartz (born August 12, 1954) is a political activist and political and social theorist. He is a Professor of Political Science at Temple University, where he served as department chair from 2000-2005.

== Biography ==
Schwartz received his B.A. in History from Cornell University where he was a Telluride Scholar, and a PhD in Political Science from Harvard University. He also received his second B.A. at Oxford University (in Politics, Philosophy and Economics) as a recipient of a Marshall Scholarship.

Schwartz, beginning in high school with the anti-Vietnam War movement, has long been active on the democratic left. He played a role in the United States anti-apartheid movement while a graduate student at Harvard in the early 1980s. Since then he has been active in the movement for a single-payer national health care system and in fights against cuts in social services at the state and national level. He is a member of the executive committee of the American Federation of Teachers faculty and staff union at Temple University Schwartz serves as a Vice-Chair of the Democratic Socialists of America (DSA) and was a member of its National Political Committee. He is a frequent contributor to such popular left publications as In These Times, Dissent, and Democratic Left.

Schwartz writes and teaches in the areas of radical and socialist political thought, as well as contemporary American politics, focusing upon how the ways in which conflicts around race, class, and gender influence social and economic policy outcomes.

== Academic work ==
Schwartz's work in political and social theory examines the role competing ideologies play in political life. He asserts that political theory should not speak a ghettoized, jargon-laden "private, academic language;" rather, it should inform public intellectual and political deliberation. He is a past recipient of the Temple University College of Liberal Arts Distinguished Teaching Award, Temple University's Lindback Prize for Teaching Excellence.

His first book, (Princeton, 1995) critiques the radical longing for a society that transcends particular identity and the need for politics. While affirming much of Marx's critique of capitalism, it contends that Karl Marx's vision of a conflict-free post-revolutionary society had negative effects on future radical theory and practice. The book won the North American Society for Social Philosophy Prize for the best book published in 1995. According to WorldCat, the book is held in 476 libraries

His second major work, The Future of Democratic Equality: Reconstructing Social Solidarity in a Fragmented United States (Routledge, 2009) won the American Political Science Association's 2011 David Easton Award for the best book published in political and social theory in the past five years. According to WorldCat, the book is held in 461 libraries In this book, Schwartz cautions against a potential new form of radical orthodoxy: that universal forms of identity are repressive and homogenizing, whereas particular identities are inherently emancipatory. The work argues that defenders of a democratic conception of "difference" must not forget that "difference," if constructed upon a terrain of radical social inequality, yields unjust inequalities in social and political power. The book also examines whether a democratic and egalitarian politics remains possible in the era of global "neoliberal" capitalism.

Schwartz has also published numerous scholarly articles on topics ranging from just war theory and the war on terrorism to the challenges neo-liberal globalization poses for egalitarian politics and policy.

== Selected works ==
- The Future of Democratic Equality: Reconstructing Social Solidarity. New York: Routledge Press, 2009.
- The Permanence of the Political: A Democratic Critique of the Radical Impulse to Transcend Politics. Princeton: Princeton University Press, 1995.
- "Towards Freedom: Democratic Socialist Theory and Practice." http://www.dsausa.org/socialist_strategy#77
- The Politics of Race," Democratic Left, 32:1 (Summer 2004): 5-8. http://www.dsausa.org/socialist_strategy#76
