= Telluride Association Summer Program =

Former Cornell University program

- Formation: 1954
- Founder: Telluride Association
- Founded at: Cornell University
- Dissolved: 2021
- Type: High school summer program

Telluride Association Summer Programs, or TASPs, were selective six-week educational experiences for rising high school seniors offering intellectual challenges beyond secondary school level.

== Description ==
The programs were designed to bring together young and intellectually bright students from around the world who share a passion for learning. The participants, or TASPers, attended an intensive seminar led by college and university faculty members and participated in many educational and social activities outside the classroom. Like the Telluride houses, each TASP received a discretionary budget, whose use was democratically distributed via weekly house meetings.

Many students were invited to apply based on strong standardized test scores, such as by scoring highly on the PSAT, or through the nomination from educators who were familiar with TASP. However, any high school junior could request an application, and acceptance largely ignored standardized test scores and graded academic performance. Like other Telluride programs, TASPs were free.

TASPs also advocated a self-contained community of learning among the TASPers at any one of the four TASP seminars. TASPers were encouraged to engage in activities together outside of seminars. Often, TASPers formed close bonds over six weeks as a result of the self-contained community that formed.

Since the first TASP was held in 1954, TASPs were held at college and university campuses across the United States, including Cornell University, the University of Texas at Austin, Deep Springs College, Johns Hopkins University, Williams College, the University of Michigan, Washington University in St. Louis, Kenyon College, and St. John's College.

== Admissions ==
Applicants to TASP were required to write essays in response to six prompts, with each essay a maximum length of 1,500 words. Sample essay prompts included "Discuss a specific problem or topic in a field that interests you" and "Write a critical analysis of a book, poem, play, essay, or other text you have read outside of school." Promising candidates received an interview with one or more Telluride associates. Applicants' test scores and transcripts were given only limited consideration, with application readers selecting for "geographic, economic, and racial diversity" and students who would thrive in a community environment. In 2012, the program's admissions rate was 4.4 percent.

== Alumni ==
=== Students ===
Notable alumni of TASPs include:

- World Bank president Paul Wolfowitz (1960)
- Political theorist William Galston (1962)
- Writers Guild of America West president Howard A. Rodman (1966)
- Queer theorist Eve Kosofsky Sedgwick (1966)
- Political economist Francis Fukuyama (1969)
- Journalist and biographer Walter Isaacson (1969)
- Stanford Law School dean Kathleen Sullivan (1971)
- Philosopher Anthony Weston (1971)
- Filmmaker Glen Pitre (1972)
- Lawyer Loulan Pitre Jr. (1978)
- Paralympic medalist Bonnie St. John (1981)
- Harvard Law School professor Noah Feldman (1987)
- Democratic politician Stacey Abrams (1990)
- Journalist and author Euny Hong (1990)
- Neurobiologist Rachel Wilson (1991)
- Stanford University professor and n+1 cofounder Mark Greif (1992)
- Author Daniel Alarcón (1994)
- Manhattan Institute president Reihan Salam (1996)
- Journalist Graeme Wood (1996)

=== Faculty ===
Nationally known faculty who taught at TASPs include:

- Robert Nozick (1965)
- Donald Kagan (1965, 1967)
- Herbert Storing (1967)
- John Schaar (1970–1972, 1979, 1981, 1986, 1989–1990)
- Barbara Herman (1978, 1985, 1987)
- Leon Kass (1986)
- Hanna Fenichel Pitkin (1989)
- Thomas Palaima (2005)
- Petrine Archer-Straw (2008)
- Blakey Vermeule (2018)

== Program revamp ==
Starting with the summer of 2022, the Telluride Association retired the names of its two previous summer programs, including TASP and the Telluride Association Sophomore Seminar (TASS). Instead, the Association began offering summer programs under two new names: the Telluride Association Summer Seminar in Critical Black Studies (TASS-CBS) and the Telluride Association Summer Seminar in Anti-Oppressive Studies (TASS-AOS). In September 2026, the association announced that TASS will not offer sessions in summer 2027 to allow for time for review and implementation of operational and program changes.

== Criticism ==
Vincent Lloyd, professor and director of Africana studies at Villanova University, wrote an article about his experience teaching at one of the restructured courses that replaced the Telluride Association Summer Program. He described a cult-like experience focused on parroting anti-racist slogans. He stated that two Asian students, as well as himself, were kicked out of the program for alleged racism.(subscription required)

Alumna Ani Wilcenski, a writer for the conservative-leaning Tablet magazine, described a similar atmosphere during her tenure in 2015. She claims the program has no process for disagreement, and that all disagreeable personalities are simply insulted and then made to leave the program. She also claims the program focuses heavily on reinforcing how differently privileged everyone is, without fostering dialogue, and that the program outright prohibits close friendships as being socially unfair "exclusive relationships".
