= John Niederhauser =

American agricultural scientist

John Strong Niederhauser (September 27, 1916 – August 12, 2005) was an American agricultural scientist. He was awarded the 1990 World Food Prize for his leadership in advancing wider and more effective production of the potato and its resistance to disease.

During his nearly 60 years in international agriculture, he became internationally known as "Mr. Potato” for his contributions as a researcher, educator, leader, and cooperator in potato development programs and for his innovations and achievements in providing food to the world. In part due to his accomplishments, the potato currently ranks fourth in consumption among the world's staple foods, after wheat, rice, and maize.

John Niederhauser was born in Seattle to Charles and Ruth Strong Niederhauser. Charles, a chemistry teacher, and Ruth, a homemaker, had two other children, Ruth Loiuse and Sydney. The children were raised on an apple farm in rural Washington. In 1933, John enrolled in Deep Springs College, a small college where students spent the morning working on the college ranch and the afternoon in class. At the end of his second year, he was accepted into Cornell University and offered a scholarship to fund his studies. The summer of 1935, just before moving to Cornell University, John took advantage of a steamship promotion and bought a ticket for a summer adventure in Europe and decided to travel to the farthest port offered, Leningrad (now Saint Petersburg). This summer adventure changed the course of his life.

John traveled from Leningrad to Moscow, where his aunt lived, and while in Moscow, he was browsing agricultural posters and serendipitously met Nikolai Vavilov, a prominent Russian plant geneticist. When Vavilov realized that John knew how to drive and repair tractors, which was a rare skill in 1935, he helped him travel to a state farm in Chernigov in Ukraine. John earned a small stipend as one of the tractor drivers on the farm, which grew wheat, beets, and cabbage. When he returned to Moscow at the end of the summer on the way back to the United States, he paid a visit to Vavilov to thank him for the opportunity and during that visit, Vavilov offered him acceptance to the Timiryazev All-Union Academy for Agricultural Sciences, which was the top agricultural school in the U.S.S.R. John was able to delay his Cornell Scholarship for one year. He spent the 1935-36 academic year in Moscow, and then moved to Cornell University the following year.

During course registration at Cornell University, John met Herbert Hice Whetzel, the founder of the Cornell University Department of Plant Pathology and Whetzel convinced him to become a plant pathologist. Under Whetzel John completed his undergraduate studies in 1939 and his Ph.D. ("The rust of greenhouse-grown spearmint and its control") in 1943 at Cornell University.

John's career focused on potato and potato diseases. He first gained experience with potato while at Cornell University, where he worked for the New York State Seed Certification Service during the summer while he was in graduate school. After graduation, he became an extension plant pathologist, replacing Mortier Barrus, who was the first extension plant pathologist in the United States. In 1947, John was recruited by George Harrar, a former student of Elvin Stakman, to join the Rockefeller Foundation's Mexican Agricultural Program.

In the 1960s Niederhauser worked at MAP, occupied with the Phytophthora infestans situation in Central Mexico. Assuming that the locals had simply never tried breeding for late blight resistance, he was surprised to find that resistant seed he shipped in from New York State fell to the local P. i. races as easily as the local seed stock did. Niederhauser then spent the next several years investigating and remedying this problem, by breeding in resistance from wild Solanum demissum native to the same area, especially in the Toluca Valley.

Niederhauser's life and career in plant pathology are described in an autobiographical book, Recollections of a Life in Science and Agriculture.

He died in Tucson in 2005.
