= Olmsted Station Powerhouse =

- Olmsted Power Station
- U.S. National Register of Historic Places
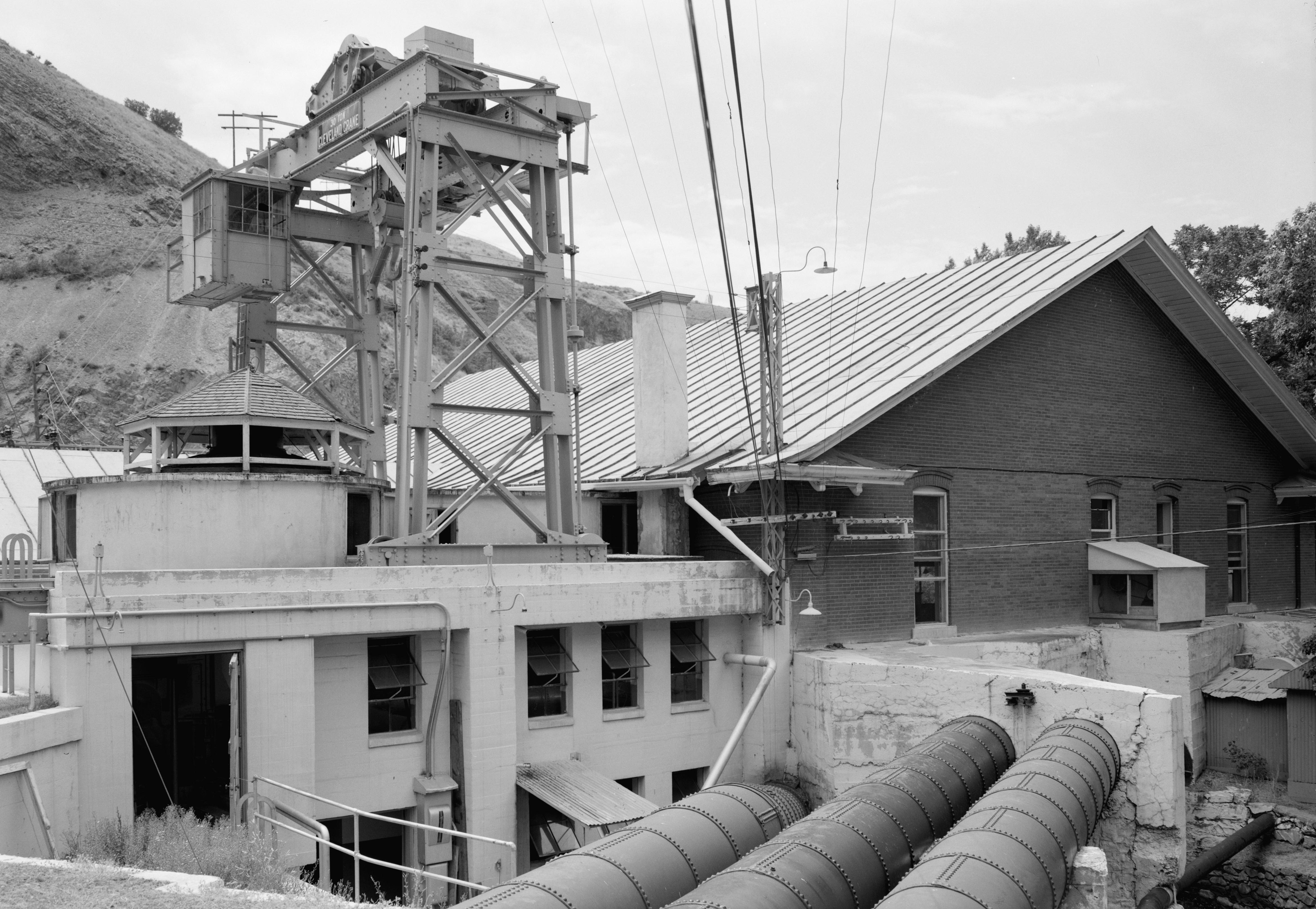
- Olmsted Power Station

- Location within Utah Location within the United States
- Location: U.S. Highway 189; Orem, Utah
- Coordinates: 40°18′57″N 111°39′14″W
- Area: 5.2 acres (2.1 ha)
- Built: April 12, 1904
- Built by: Nunn, L.L.; Nunn, P.N.
- NRHP reference No.: 72001262
- Added to NRHP: June 26, 1972

The Olmsted Power Station is a historic building located in Orem, Utah, United States. It is listed on the National Register of Historic Places. The hydropower plant was dedicated on April 12, 1904 and decommissioned on September 21, 2015. The plant will become a museum after a seismic refit of the building.

== Olmsted Station Power House * Off U.S. Highway 189 * Provo, Utah ==
The Olmsted Station Power House was built in 1904, by L. L. Nunn and his brother and chief engineer, P. N. Nunn. The plant received its name in honor of Fay Devaux Olmsted, who played a key role in helping the Nunn brothers design the plant, contracted and died from Tuberculosis before the plant was completed. The plant, when running at full capacity, was able to provide twelve megawatts of power, which is enough for about 3,000 homes. Along with the Power station, these men established an institute, known as the Telluride Institute, which was home to approximately forty students. This institute was the first corporation sponsored electrical school in the U.S. and continued to operate until 1912 when Utah Power and Light Company attained the property.

=== History ===
In order to harvest the power of falling water, new technology needed to be invented. To facilitate this, the Nunn brothers worked with George Westinghouse, hoping he would be able to use falling water to power transformers, switches, and water powered generators. The Nunn brothers provided Westinghouse with a pouch of gold worth $50,000, and eventually, the technology was available so that the plant could be built and become an efficient energy source. The Olmsted power station was decommissioned in 2015.

=== Original equipment ===
Although there have been extensions to the original equipment in both 1917 and 1948, the Olmsted Station Power House still retains some original equipment. The original equipment comprises Three general Electric generators (2300 volts), Three Lambard governors, One general electric water driven exciter with Pelton wheel (125 DC volts), Nine general electric transformers (2300–44,000 volts), Nine Westinghouse oil switches, One sycrometer, and Four general electric field rheostats.

It was listed on the National Register of Historic Places in 1972; the listing included two contributing buildings on 5.2 acres (2.1 ha).
