= L. L. Nunn =

American businessman and educator (1853–1925)

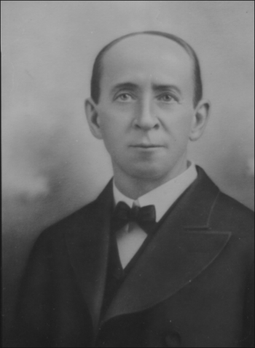
Lucien Lucius Nunn

Lucien Lucius Nunn (16 March 1853 Medina, Ohio – 2 April 1925 Los Angeles, California) was an American entrepreneur and educator who founded the Telluride House, the Telluride Association, and Deep Springs College. He received his higher education at Oberlin College and studied law at Harvard Law School.

== Career ==
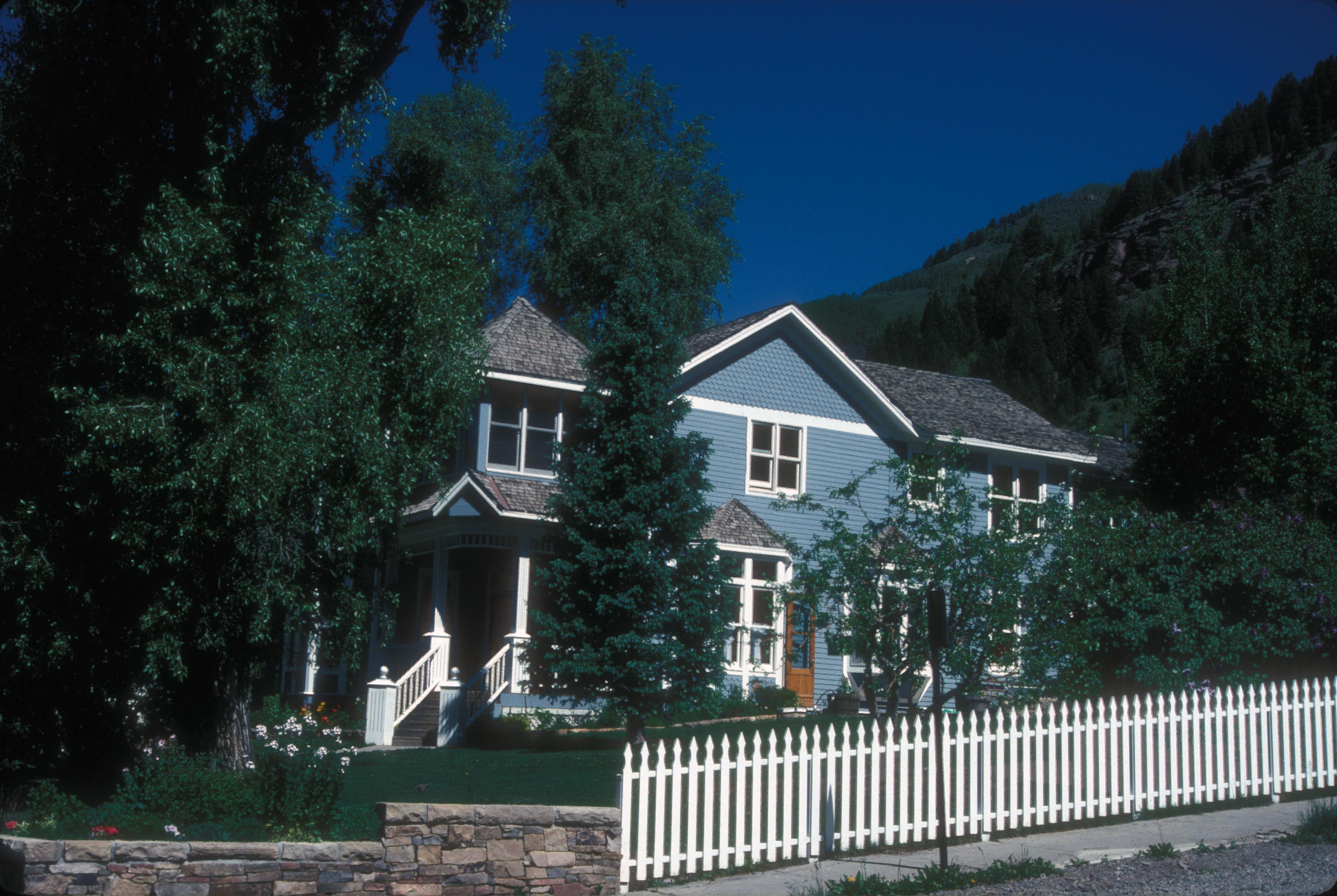
Nunn's house in Telluride

In 1880, Nunn moved to Telluride, Colorado, where he started a law practice and dealt in real estate. By 1890 he had become involved in gold mining, journalism, and banking within the small community. His first bank, the San Miguel Valley Bank, was robbed in 1889 by Robert Leroy Parker, later known as Butch Cassidy. He closed that first bank and opened the First National Bank of Telluride, an impressive stone building that remains today. In order to help his mining operations prosper, and because of the extremely high cost of coal for steam power generation, Nunn persuaded George Westinghouse to engineer and help finance the world's first A/C power plant used for industrial purposes (mining), the Ames Hydroelectric Generating Plant. This plant, built by George Westinghouse, became part of the Nunn's Telluride Power Company which would later become part of Utah Power and Light. Nunn continued investing in the power industry and helped design the Ontario Power Plant in Niagara Falls, Ontario. To staff the power plants Nunn created a work study program called the Telluride Institute, headquartered near the Olmsted Power Plant, located in the Provo Canyon near Orem, Utah. Upon completion of the course the graduates were sent on to gain further education through the issuance of scholarships. Many of these students went on to study at Cornell University, where they resided at Telluride House, managed by Telluride Association, which Nunn founded.

Nunn was forced to sell his portion of Telluride Power in 1912 due to disagreements with other stockholders, which led to the closure of the Olmsted educational site and the suspension of the Telluride Institute program.

== Accomplishments ==
The Telluride Association at Cornell (and in time elsewhere) still remains to this day. Its mission eventually expanded to encompass a variety of intellectually intense residential houses for college students, summer programs for high school students, scholarships, and other activities, all coeducational. Finally he founded Deep Springs College in 1917, a highly regarded two-year college built on the "Swinging T Ranch" in the remote Deep Springs Valley, California. The college is similar in style to the Telluride Institute, in that students must work while completing their academic requirements and are engaged in a significant measure of self-governance. The New Yorker described the style of education Nunn established at Deep Springs as "a novel form of education, a mix of Christian mysticism, imperialist elitism, Boy Scout-like abstinence, and Progressive era learning-by-doing, with an emphasis on leadership training and the formation of strong character." He financially supported American zoologist Charles Otis Whitman's work. Whitman was married to Nunn's sister Emily, herself a zoologist.

== Death and burial ==
Nunn died in 1925 as a result of tuberculosis which he contracted a decade earlier. He was interred at Forest Lawn Memorial Park, Glendale, California.
