= Herbert Reich (engineer) =

American engineer

Herbert Reich (October 25, 1900, Staten Island – 2000, Massachusetts) was a pioneering figure in electrical engineering. Reich made substantial contributions towards the design of early oscilloscopes as a graduate student at Cornell University. Reich later taught as a Professor of Electrical Engineering at University of Illinois (1929–44) and Yale University (1946–69). From 1944 to 1946 he worked at the Radio Research Laboratory at Harvard University with Frederick Terman. After his retirement from Yale, he periodically taught courses at Deep Springs College.

Reich had been a member of the inaugural class at Deep Springs, and he later continued his higher education at Cornell, where he completed a degree in mechanical engineering (1924) and a Ph.D. in physics (1928).
