= Gordon Davidson =

Gordon Davidson may refer to:

- Gordon Davidson (director) (1933–2016), American stage and film director
- Gordon Davidson (politician) (1915–2002), Australian politician
- Gordon Davidson (ice hockey) (1918–2004), Canadian ice hockey player
- Gordon B. Davidson (1926–2015), American business attorney and sponsor of Muhammad Ali
