= William A. Masters =

American academic

William Alan Masters
- Born: April 23, 1961 (age 64); Chicago, Illinois, U.S.

Academic background
- Education: Deep Springs College; Yale University (BA); Stanford University (PhD)

Academic work
- Discipline: Food policy and agricultural economics
- Institutions: Tufts University

William Alan Masters (born April 23, 1961) is an American economist, teaching and conducting research on agricultural economics and food policy in the Friedman School of Nutrition at Tufts University, where he also has a secondary appointment in the Department of Economics.

== Education ==
William A. Masters was educated in the U.S. and France then attended Deep Springs College (1979–81) before transferring to Yale University for a BA (1984) in Economics & Political Science. He received his PhD (1991) in Applied Economics from Stanford University, through the Food Research Institute.

== Career ==
He served as a Research Associate and Lecturer at the University of Zimbabwe (1989–90), and then was a faculty member in Agricultural Economics at Purdue University (1991-2010), with leave years at the Harvard Kennedy School of Government (2000) and the Earth Institute at Columbia University (2003–04). He served as co-editor of the journal Agricultural Economics from 2006 to 2011, and moved to Tufts in 2010 where he served as chair of the Department of Food and Nutrition Policy from 2011 to 2014.

== Awards ==
In 2026, he was awarded the Borgstrom Prize in Global Food Security from the Royal Swedish Academy of Agriculture and Forestry in Stockholm. He is also a Fellow of the American Society for Nutrition (FASN), elected in 2025, and since 2020 also a Fellow of the Agricultural & Applied Economics Association from which he received the Bruce Gardner Memorial Prize for Applied Policy Analysis (2013) for work on pay-for-performance contributing to the World Bank's AgResults program, the Publication of Enduring Quality Award (2014) for work on climatic factors in economic growth, the Quality of Research Discovery Award (2019) for work on caregiver incentives in child nutrition, and the Quality of Communications Award (2022) for work on cost and affordability of nutritious diets. He is also an International Fellow of the African Association of Agricultural Economists (2010), and as a student he was supported by a Harry S. Truman Scholarship (1981), a Fulbright Dissertation Research Grant (1988) among other awards.

== Publications ==
Together with Amelia B. Finaret, he is the author of the widely-used textbook Food Economics: Agriculture, Nutrition and Health, and the related Handbook of Agricultural Economics section on "The economics of malnutrition: Dietary transition and food system transformation". He began his career working on farm productivity and food markets, starting with two years of farm household surveys in Zimbabwe whose results were published as a book entitled Government and Agriculture in Zimbabwe. While on the faculty at Purdue University he conducted fieldwork and teaching across Southern, Eastern and Western Africa, including early use of climate data to identify the role of winter frosts in economic development. From that period of his career he co-authored a textbook entitled Economics of Agricultural Development: World Food Systems and Resource Use (4th edition, 2021). After moving to Tufts in 2010 he focused on the economics of nutrition, including pioneering work on caregiver incentives, on the composition of infant foods, and most recently on the development of new price indexes for the cost and affordability of healthy diets. This new approach to measuring food security was introduced by the FAO in 2020 for the annual UN agency flagship report on The State of Food Security and Nutrition in the World, and since 2022 has been used for annual global monitoring jointly by the FAO and the World Bank, as well as monitoring within countries by national government agencies in Ethiopia, Ghana, Nigeria, Malawi, Pakistan and elsewhere.
