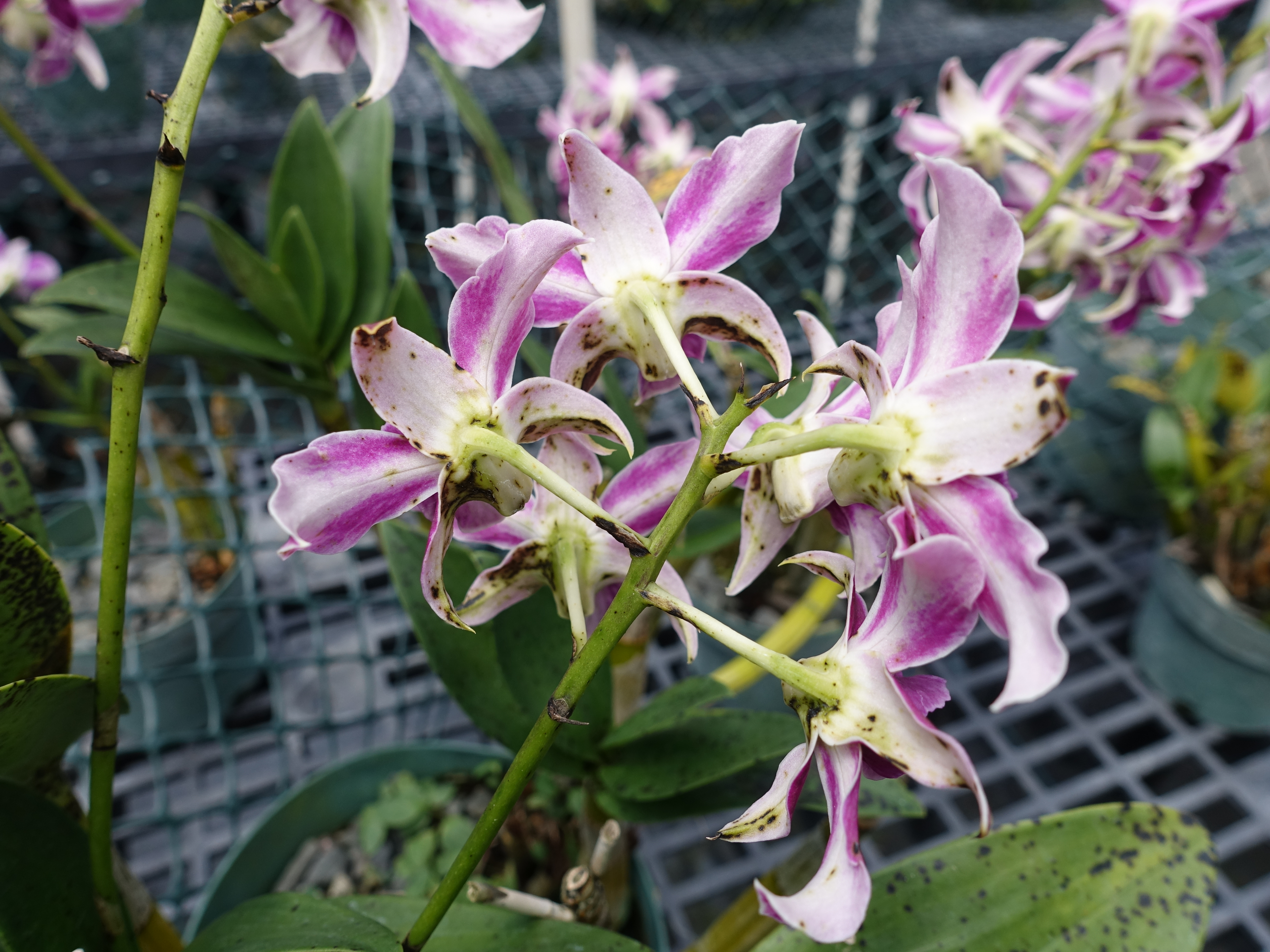
- Symptoms of Odontoglossum ringspot caused by Odontoglossum ringspot virus

Virus classification
- (unranked): Virus
- Realm: Riboviria
- Kingdom: Orthornavirae
- Phylum: Kitrinoviricota
- Class: Alsuviricetes
- Order: Martellivirales
- Family: Virgaviridae
- Genus: Tobamovirus
- Species: Tobamovirus odontoglossi

Synonyms
- Tobacco mosaic virus—orchid strain

= Odontoglossum ringspot virus =

Species of virus

Odontoglossum ringspot virus (ORSV) is a plant pathogenic virus that belongs to the family Virgaviridae. It is one of the most common viruses affecting cultivated orchids, perhaps second only to the Cymbidium mosaic virus. It causes spots on leaves and colored streaks on flowers. If a plant is also infected with the Cymbidium mosaic virus, it can lead to a condition called blossom brown necrotic streak.

== Phylogenetics ==
Its genome has been sequenced and contains approximately 6600 nucleotides organized into four open reading frames. Its similarity to other tobamoviruses can be seen from the genetic data and the (limited) ability of a Tobacco mosaic virus modified to contain ORSV movement protein to infect tobacco. However, only about 60% of the nucleotides in ORSV are identical with Tobacco mosaic virus.
