= Sunn-hemp mosaic virus =

Virus classification
- (unranked): Virus
- Realm: Riboviria
- Kingdom: Orthornavirae
- Phylum: Kitrinoviricota
- Class: Alsuviricetes
- Order: Martellivirales
- Family: Virgaviridae
- Genus: Tobamovirus
- Species: Tobamovirus crotalariae

Synonyms
- bean strain of tobacco mosaic virus; cowpea strain of tobacco mosaic virus; cowpea chlorotic spot virus; cowpea mosaic virus (Lister & Thresh, 1955), now known as a variant of Sunn-Hemp Mosaic Virus; cowpea yellow mosaic virus; Crotalaria mucronata mosaic virus (Raychaudhuri & Pathanian, 1950), now known as a variant of Sunn-Hemp Mosaic Virus; dolichos enation mosaic virus (Capoor & Varma, 1948), now known as a variant of Sunn-Hemp Mosaic Virus; Hemp mosaic virus; Sunn-hemp rosette virus; Sunnhemp mosaic virus

Species of virus

Sunn-hemp mosaic virus (SHMV) is a pathogenic plant virus. It is known by many names, including bean strain of tobacco mosaic virus and Sunn-hemp rosette virus. SHMV is an intracellular parasite that infects plants. It can be seen only through an electron microscope. It is a positive-sense single-stranded RNA virus that causes physical characteristics of spotting and/or discoloration. The Sunn-hemp mosaic virus is listed as a species within the genus Tobamovirus and the virus family Virgaviridae by the International Committee on the Taxonomy of Viruses, who renamed it from "Sunnhemp" to "Sunn-hemp" in 1991.

== Transmission ==
Infected crops transmit the virus in a number of ways, but in most cases transmittal requires physical contact. This mean that touching an infected plant, then touching a healthy plant could cause the healthy plant to contract the virus. Using tools to trim an infected plant, then using them on a healthy plant without sterilizing them between uses can result in the transmission of the virus. The virus should be treated like it is airborne since an insect can transmit the virus, from plant to plant, just by flying around and making contact between plants. Hemp mosaic virus is particularly resilient and can infect the soil through the winter and into the following growing seasons for years.

== Effects ==
The Sunn-hemp mosaic virus should not be confused with the hemp mosaic virus. The virus causes cellular mutations, stunted growth, damages plants photosynthesis ability, and more. Cellular mutations usually manifest as discoloration and misshapen leaves. Discoloration usually manifests as yellow or grey mottling that can form a spotted, mosaic, or streak pattern. Misshapen leaves can be the result of damage to the plants at a cellular level, making them appear contorted and/or twisted. The stunted growth can cause a tremendous amount of crop loss due to lower than normal yields. Losses of 25% of flower production or more have been widely observed and reported.

== Treatment ==
There is no known cure for the hemp mosaic virus or other tobamoviruses. Once a plant has become infected with the virus the host will never be free from infection. The virus is destroyed through incineration of the infected tissues. Plants do have a natural defense in the form of a protein coating that protects the plants RNA. Different strains have varying resiliencies to hemp mosaic virus due to varying levels of the hormone responsible for the production of the protective protein coatings.

== Environment ==
Hemp mosaic virus is known as one of the most stable viruses. It has a very wide survival range. As long as the surrounding temperature remains below approximately 40 degrees Celsius, hemp mosaic virus can sustain its stable form. All it needs is a host to infect. Greenhouses and botanical gardens would provide the most favorable condition for the virus to spread, due to the high population density of possible hosts and the constant temperature throughout the year.

The virus "occurs naturally in leguminous plants in Australia, India, Nigeria, and the United States" and has been described with a variety of names based on the host from which it was isolated. It has been observed to infect more than 40 host species across seven different families of plant.
