= Tomato mottle mosaic virus =

Virus classification
- (unranked): Virus
- Realm: Riboviria
- Kingdom: Orthornavirae
- Phylum: Kitrinoviricota
- Class: Alsuviricetes
- Order: Martellivirales
- Family: Virgaviridae
- Genus: Tobamovirus
- Species: Tobamovirus maculatessellati

Species of virus

Tomato mottle mosaic virus is a Tobamovirus which infects Solanum lycopersicum. First detected in Mexico in 2013 from S. lycopersicum samples taken in 2009, ToMMV has since been found worldwide. In 2014, some S. lycopersicum samples from Florida in 2010 and 2012 and a Nicotiana tabacum 'Xanthi nc' sample were retested using an assay that distinguishes ToMMV from other Tobamoviruses, especially the closely related (and initially suspected) Tomato mosaic virus and Tobacco mosaic virus. These samples tested positive for ToMMV, indicating that the virus was widespread and had been for several years prior to when it was recognized.

== Geographic distribution ==
- United States
  - California, Florida, New York State, South Carolina
- Australia
- Brazil
  - São Paulo
- China
  - Gansu, Hainan, Hunan, Liaoning, Inner Mongolia, Shaanxi, the Tibet Autonomous Region, Yunnan
- Czech Republic in 2020
- Israel in 2014
- Iran
- Mexico
- Spain
