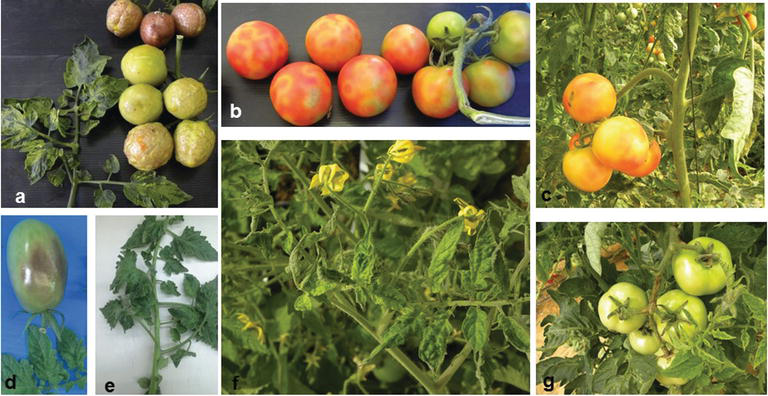
- Tomato brown rugose fruit virus (ToBRFV)-infected tomato plants

Virus classification
- (unranked): Virus
- Realm: Riboviria
- Kingdom: Orthornavirae
- Phylum: Kitrinoviricota
- Class: Alsuviricetes
- Order: Martellivirales
- Family: Virgaviridae
- Genus: Tobamovirus
- Species: Tobamovirus fructirugosum

= Tomato brown rugose fruit virus =

Species of virus

Tomato brown rugose fruit virus (ToBRFV) is a plant virus in the genus Tobamovirus that was first described in 2015. It has spread rapidly since it was first noted in Jordan and Israel. The main hosts are tomato and peppers. The virus causes symptoms including mosaic and distortion of leaves and brown, wrinkly spots (rugose) on fruits. Outbreaks can be severe and leave fruit unmarketable.

== History and distribution ==
In 2015 greenhouse tomato crops in Jordan showed mild foliar symptoms during the season, with fruit then developing strong brown rugose symptoms. Total RNA was extracted from the plants and Reverse transcription polymerase chain reaction (RT-PCR) were negative for many common tomato viruses but indicated the presence of a new tobamovirus. After sequencing and characterisation, the name tomato brown fruit rugose virus (ToBRFV) was proposed. The name was approved by the International Committee on Taxonomy of Viruses later the same year. In 2019 it was confirmed that symptoms observed on Capsicum annuum crops in Jordan in 2015 and 2016 were caused by infection of ToBRFV and Tobacco mild green mosaic virus.

A disease with similar symptoms had emerged earlier in Ohad, Israel in the Autumn of 2014 and began to spread in the country within a year. Transmission electron microscopy showed the presence of rod-like viral structures consistent with Tobamovirus and the complete sequence showed high sequence identity to the Jordanian isolate of Tomato brown rugose fruit virus. The infected plants in Israel were cultivars that carried the Tm-2^{2} resistance gene which confers diseases resistance against some other tobamoviruses. ToBRFV has also been confirmed from Palestine with symptoms first noted in Autumn 2018.

Tomato brown rugose fruit virus spread rapidly to other tomato growing regions. After emerging in Israel and Jordan, the virus spread to Europe. Symptoms were noted in July 2018 on 25 hectares of greenhouse tomatoes in Germany. Plants were found to be infected with both ToBRFV and Pepino mosaic virus. (This is not the first report of PMV in tomato, as this has been known to occur since the discovery of TMV.) Measures to eradicate the virus were taken. In Autumn of 2018 symptoms were noted on tomato crops in Sicily, Italy and confirmed as being caused by ToBRFV. In May 2019 ToBRFV emerged on tomato crops in mainland Italy, in the Piemonte region. This outbreak was eradicated.

Disease caused by Tomato brown rugose fruit virus also emerged in North America in Autumn 2018, initially being reported from Mexico. This also included the first case of Capsicum being infected. An outbreak was also detected in California in Autumn 2018 and eradicated by the California Department of Food and Agriculture. The pathway of introduction into North America was unknown. By February 2019, ToBRFV had been detected in 20 States across Mexico, and the first positive in aubergine was reported.

In January 2019 the first case of ToBRFV in Turkey was reported in tomato crops grown in greenhouses in Antalya province which since then spread to Ankara, Eskişehir, Bartın, and Zonguldak provinces as of 2022. In April 2019 disease on tomato crops in Shandong, China was confirmed to be caused by ToBRFV, the pathway of introduction to China was unknown. New outbreaks also emerged in Europe over the course of 2019. In Summer 2019 the first outbreak of ToBRFV occurred in the United Kingdom, with action taken to eradicate the virus. The Netherlands also reported their first outbreak on tomato crops, as well as Greece, Spain and ToBRFV was reported from France in January 2020. By February 2020, 17 outbreaks had been detected in the Netherlands; an additional 9 sites were infected in Spain and the first outbreak on Capsicum annuum was detected in Italy. In August 2021 the first positive case of ToBRFV was confirmed in Slovenia. Department of Primary Industries and Regions South Australia (PIRSA) reported an outbreak in two farms in August 2024, prompting an Australian Tomato import ban by New Zealand.

ToBRFV is abundant in treated municipal wastewater effluent, and is being investigated as a surrogate that can be monitored, to verify removal of viruses by membrane filters (e.g. microfiltration, ultrafiltration, and membrane bioreactors) that are an important treatment in some water reuse facilities. ToBRFV can be monitored in wastewater effluent using the same qPCR technologies that are also used to monitor SARS-CoV-2 in wastewater effluent.

== Hosts and symptoms ==
Most outbreaks of ToBRFV have been reported on tomato, but Capsicum species have also been reported to be infected. An instance of infection of aubergine has been reported in Mexico, but the virus could not be experimentally transmitted to this host in other studies. It has also been detected on weed species.

Symptoms in tomato vary based on the tomato variety and may be mild to severe. Foliar symptoms include mild to severe mosaic, narrowing and discolouration. Classic symptoms are the brown and wrinkled (rugose) patches that form on infected fruits, though fruits may also be misshapen or turn yellow and are often unmarketable due to symptoms.

On sweet peppers, symptoms include mosaic, discolouration and vein clearing on young leaves, browning of the stem and mosaic and distortion of fruits.

== Transmission ==
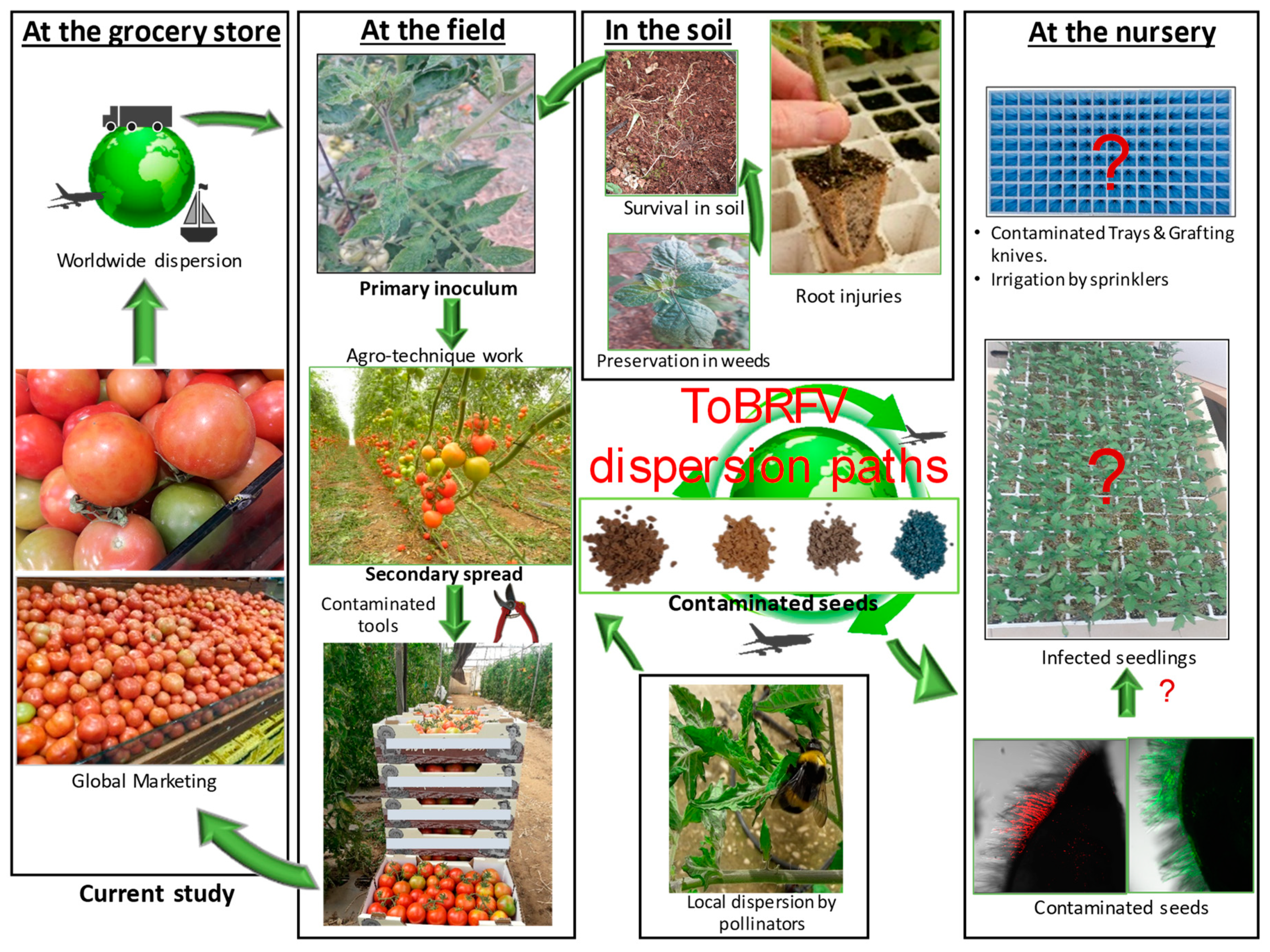
Different transmission means of tomato brown rugose fruit virus

Tomato brown rugose fruit virus can be transmitted mechanically - the virus is stable outside of the plant and so can spread between plants on contaminated tools, clothes or hands. Seed transmission is suspected but has not yet been verified, though it has been detected on tomato seed moving in trade. The virus can also spread via plant propagation. It has been inferred that mechanical transmission from the seed coat to the growing plant may occur.

Buff-tailed bumblebees are often used in tomato production to pollinate plants. It has been found that bumblebees can also spread ToBRFV between tomato as they pick up the virus during pollination.

== Management ==
Several cultivars have been developed with resistance against ToBRV and are sold commercially. As the virus is transmitted easily through mechanical means, hygiene best practise is essential to reduce impacts when outbreaks are detected. The virus can survive a long time on various surfaces - at least 2 hours on skin and gloves, at least 3 on hard plastics and at least 1 month on glass, aluminium and stainless steel. The disinfectants Virkon S and Huwa-San are effective on most surfaces, but only after an hour of exposure. Plastic trays can be soaked in hot water (90 °C (194 °F) for 5 minutes) to eliminate the virus, or at 70 °C (158 °F) for 5 minutes and then treated with Virkon.
