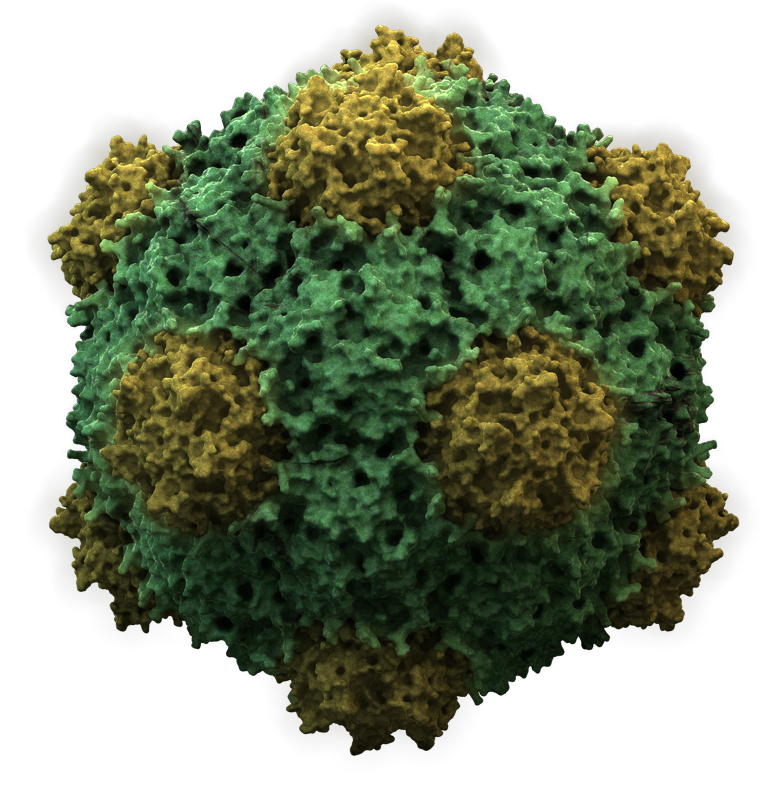
- Structure of the Cowpea mosaic virus based on PDB 2BFU

Virus classification
- (unranked): Virus
- Realm: Riboviria
- Kingdom: Orthornavirae
- Phylum: Pisuviricota
- Class: Pisoniviricetes
- Order: Picornavirales
- Family: Secoviridae
- Genus: Comovirus
- Species: Comovirus vignae

Synonyms
- Cowpea mosaic virus, SB isolate

= Cowpea mosaic virus =

Species of virus

Cowpea mosaic virus (CPMV) is a non-enveloped plant virus of the comovirus group. Infection of a susceptible cowpea leaf causes a "mosaic" pattern in the leaf, and results in high virus yields (1-2 g/kg). Its genome consists of 2 molecules of positive-sense RNA (RNA-1 and RNA-2) which are separately encapsidated. Both RNA1 and RNA2 have a VPg (virus genome-linked protein) at the 5'end, and polyadenylation at the 3' end. Genomic RNA1 and RNA2 are expressed by a polyprotein processing strategy. RNA1 encodes helicase, VPg, protease and RdRp. RNA2 encodes movement protein and coat protein. The virus particles are 28 nm in diameter and contain 60 copies each of a Large (L) and Small (S) coat protein. The structure is well characterised to atomic resolution, and the viral particles are thermostable. The identification of the virus is attributed to Lister and Thresh in 1955, but it is now known as a variant of the Sunn-hemp mosaic virus.

CPMV displays a number of features that can be exploited for nanoscale biomaterial fabrication. Its genetic, biological and physical properties are well characterised, and it can be isolated readily from plants. There are many stable mutants already prepared that allow specific modification of the capsid surface. It is possible to attach a number of different chemicals to the virus surface and to construct multilayer arrays of such nanoparticles on solid surfaces. This gives the natural or genetically engineered nanoparticles a range of properties which could be useful in nanotechnological applications such as biosensors, catalysis and nanoelectronic devices.

One example use of CPMV particles is to amplify signals in microarray based sensors. In this application, the virus particles separate the fluorescent dyes used for signaling in order to prevent the formation of non-fluorescent dimers that act as quenchers. Another example is the use of CPMV as a nanoscale breadboard for molecular electronics.

CPMV particles have also shown potential for in-situ vaccination in cancer immunotherapy
