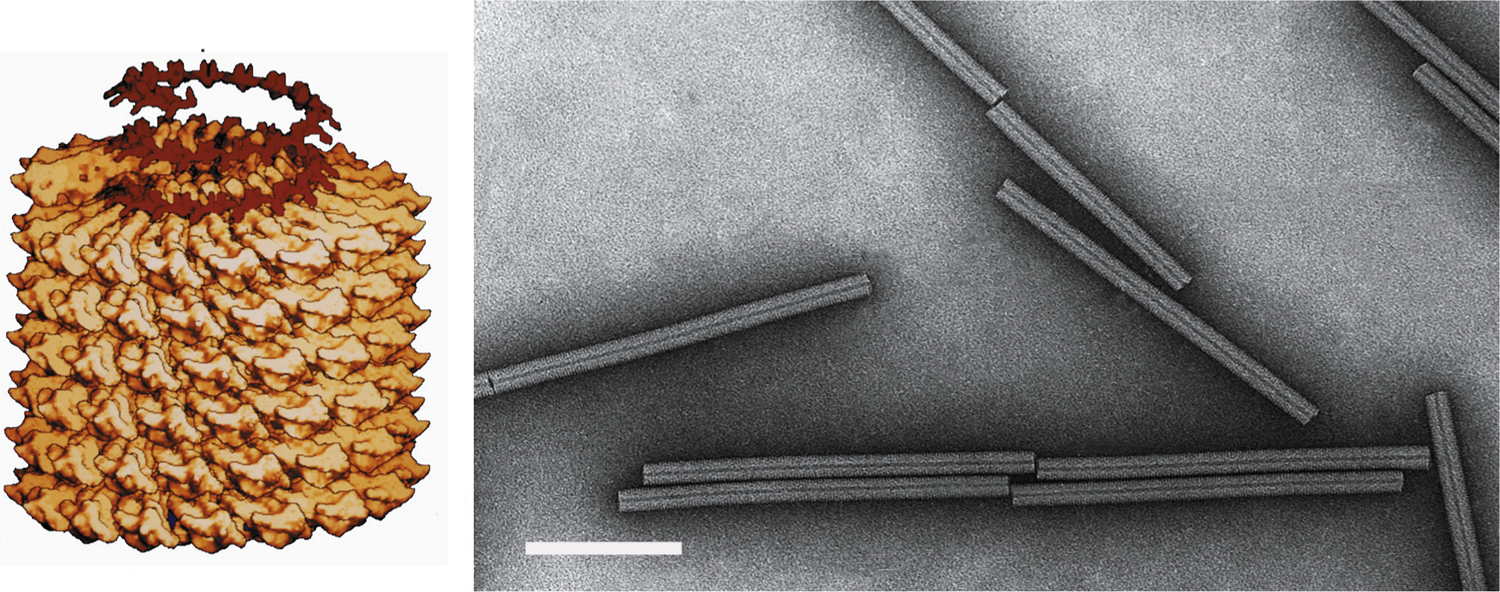
- Tobacco mosaic virus (TMV) diagram and electron micrograph of virions

Virus classification
- (unranked): Virus
- Realm: Riboviria
- Kingdom: Orthornavirae
- Phylum: Kitrinoviricota
- Class: Alsuviricetes
- Order: Martellivirales
- Family: Virgaviridae
- Genus: Tobamovirus

= Tobamovirus =

Genus of viruses

Tobamovirus is a genus of positive-strand RNA viruses in the family Virgaviridae. Many plants, including tobacco, potato, tomato, and squash, serve as natural hosts. Diseases associated with this genus include: necrotic lesions on leaves. The name Tobamovirus comes from the host and symptoms of the first virus discovered (Tobacco mosaic virus).

There are four informal subgroups within this genus: these are the tobamoviruses that infect the brassicas, cucurbits, malvaceous, and solanaceous plants. The main differences between these groups are genome sequences, and respective range of host plants. There are 37 species in this genus.

== Structure ==
Tobamoviruses are non-enveloped, with helical rod geometries, and helical symmetry. The diameter is around 18 nm, with a length of 300–310 nm. Genomes are linear and non-segmented, around 6.3–6.5kb in length.

== Genome ==
The RNA genome encodes at least four polypeptides: these are the non-structural protein and the read-through product which are involved in virus replication (RNA-dependent RNA polymerase, RdRp); the movement protein (MP) which is necessary for the virus to move between cells and the coat protein (CP). The read-through portion of the RdRp may be expressed as a separate protein in TMV. The virus is able to replicate without the movement or coat proteins, but the other two are essential. The non-structural protein has domains suggesting it is involved in RNA capping and the read-through product has a motif for an RNA polymerase. The movement proteins are made very early in the infection cycle and localized to the plasmodesmata, they are probably involved in host specificity as they are believed to interact with some host cell factors.

== Life cycle ==
Viral replication is cytoplasmic. Entry into the host cell is achieved by penetration into the host cell. Replication follows the positive stranded RNA virus replication model. Positive stranded RNA virus transcription is the method of transcription. Translation takes place by suppression of termination. The virus exits the host cell by monopartite non-tubule guided viral movement. Plants serve as the natural host. Transmission routes are mechanical.

== Enzymes ==
Tobamovirus RNA-dependent RNA polymerases are homologous with bromoviruses, ilarviruses, tobraviruses, and the carnation mottle virus.

== Routes of infection ==
The infection is localized to begin with but if the virus remains unchallenged it will spread via the vascular system into a systemic infection. The exact mechanism the virus uses to move throughout the plant is unknown but the interaction of pectin methylesterase, a cellular enzyme important for cell wall metabolism and plant development, with the movement protein has been implicated.

== Evolution ==
There are at least 3 distinct clades of tobamoviruses, which to some extent follow their host ranges: that is, there is one infecting solanaceous species; a second infecting cucurbits and legumes and a third infecting the crucifers.

== Classification ==
=== Species ===
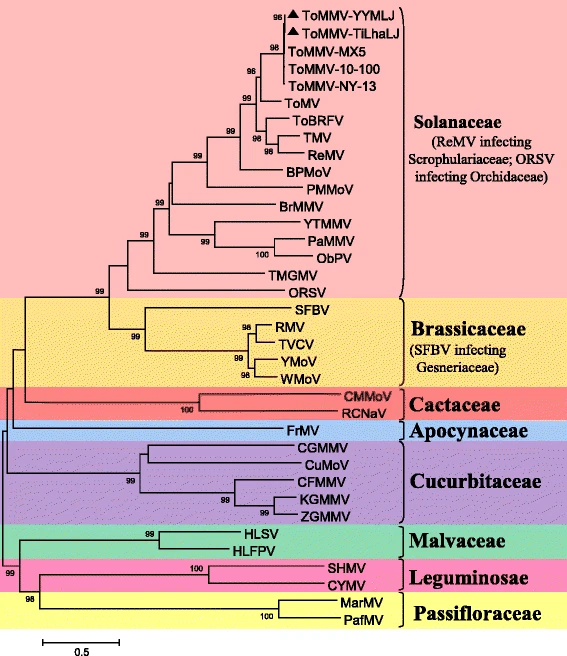
Phylogenetic tree of Tobamovirus

The genus contains the following species, listed by scientific name and followed by their common names:

- Tobamovirus anthocercis, Yellow tailflower mild mottle virus
- Tobamovirus brugmansiae, Brugmansia mild mottle virus
- Tobamovirus cacti, Cactus mild mottle virus (CMMoV)
- Tobamovirus capsici, Pepper mild mottle virus (PMMoV)
- Tobamovirus clitoriae, Clitoria yellow mottle virus
- Tobamovirus crotalariae, Sunn-hemp mosaic virus (SHMV)
- Tobamovirus cucumeris, Cucumber mottle virus
- Tobamovirus cucurbitae, Zucchini green mottle mosaic virus
- Tobamovirus fortpiercense, Hibiscus latent Fort Pierce virus (HLFPV)
- Tobamovirus frangipani, Frangipani mosaic virus (FrMV)
- Tobamovirus fructirugosum, Tomato brown rugose fruit virus (ToBRFV)
- Tobamovirus kyuri, Kyuri green mottle mosaic virus
- Tobamovirus latentabaci, Tobacco latent virus
- Tobamovirus maculacapsici, Bell pepper mottle virus (BPeMV)
- Tobamovirus maculafructi, Cucumber fruit mottle mosaic virus
- Tobamovirus maculatessellati, Tomato mottle mosaic virus
- Tobamovirus maracujae, Maracuja mosaic virus (MarMV)
- Tobamovirus mititessellati, Tobacco mild green mosaic virus
- Tobamovirus muricaudae, Rattail cactus necrosis-associated virus (RCNaV)
- Tobamovirus obudae, Obuda pepper virus (ObPV)
- Tobamovirus odontoglossi, Odontoglossum ringspot virus (ORSV)
- Tobamovirus opuntiae, Opuntia chlorotic ringspot virus
- Tobamovirus paprikae, Paprika mild mottle virus
- Tobamovirus passiflorae, Passion fruit mosaic virus
- Tobamovirus plantagonis, Ribgrass mosaic virus (HRV)
- Tobamovirus plumeriae, Plumeria mosaic virus
- Tobamovirus rapae, Turnip vein-clearing virus (TVCV)
- Tobamovirus rehmanniae, Rehmannia mosaic virus
- Tobamovirus singaporense, Hibiscus latent Singapore virus (HLSV)
- Tobamovirus streptocarpi, Streptocarpus flower break virus
- Tobamovirus tabaci, Tobacco mosaic virus (TMV)
- Tobamovirus tomatotessellati, Tomato mosaic virus (ToMV)
- Tobamovirus tropici, Tropical soda apple mosaic virus
- Tobamovirus ulluci, Ullucus mild mottle virus
- Tobamovirus viridimaculae, Cucumber green mottle mosaic virus (CGMMV)
- Tobamovirus wasabi, Wasabi mottle virus (WMoV)
- Tobamovirus youcai, Youcai mosaic virus (YoMV) a.k.a. oilseed rape mosaic virus (ORMV)

=== Proposed members ===
Proposed, but currently unrecognised members of the genus include:

- Chara corallina virus (CCV)
- Nicotiana velutina mosaic virus (NVMV)
