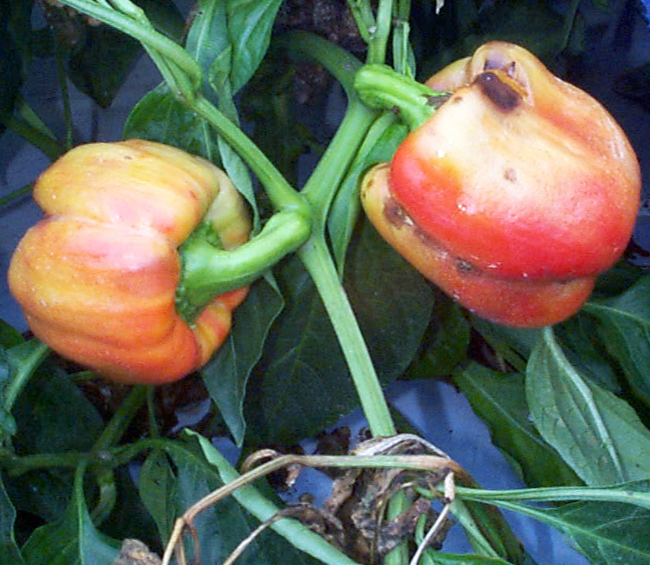
- Pepper infected with PMMoV

Virus classification
- (unranked): Virus
- Realm: Riboviria
- Kingdom: Orthornavirae
- Phylum: Kitrinoviricota
- Class: Alsuviricetes
- Order: Martellivirales
- Family: Virgaviridae
- Genus: Tobamovirus
- Species: Tobamovirus capsici

= Pepper mild mottle virus =

Species of virus

Pepper mild mottle virus (PMMoV) is a plant pathogenic virus that occurs worldwide on species of field grown bell, hot and ornamental pepper species. It is caused by members of the plant virus genus Tobamovirus—otherwise known as the tobacco mosaic virus family. Tobamovirus are viruses that contain positive sense RNA genomes that infect plants. Symptoms of the disease vary depending on the cultivar. Typical symptoms include the chlorosis of leaves, stunting, and distorted and lumpy fruiting structures. The virus is spread by mechanical transmission and infected seeds. Avoidance is the best means of controlling the disease because once a plant is infected it cannot be treated. Only seeds that have been tested and treated for the pathogen should be planted.

== History ==
The origin of PMMoV has been linked to Tomato mosaic virus, as they both reside in the Tobacco mosaic virus family. The Tunisian Journal of Plant Protection brought about the link between PMMoV to ToMV from a French study dating back to 1964. ToMV affects a wide range of Solanaceous crops and a strain of this virus likely mutated into PMMoV.

== Host and symptoms ==
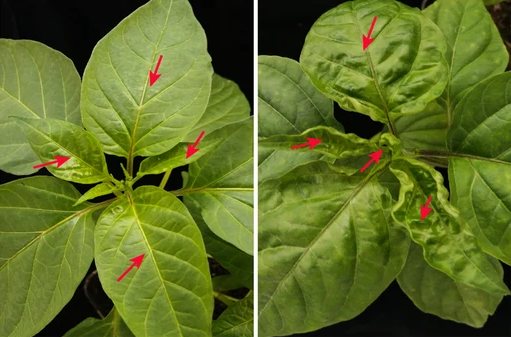
Symptoms of PMMoV infection in a healthy and infected pepper plant

Pepper mild mottle virus is the major viral pathogen of peppers (Capsicum spp.). The host range of PMMoV include most cultivars and species of pepper (Capsicum spp.). This virus strain does not infect tomato, eggplant, or tobacco; however, other members of the genus Tobamovirus can infect these other hosts. PMMoV is one of at least 4 different species of Tobamovirus that infect peppers. The others include Tobacco mosaic virus (TMV), Tomato mosaic virus (ToMV) and Tobacco mild green mosaic virus (TMGMV).

The pathogen is known to occur throughout the world and it frequently results in significant crop losses or reductions in both field and greenhouse plantings. The virus has been identified in places like Australia, Japan, China, Taiwan, Europe, and North Africa. Since 1997, PMMoV has been the cause of many major outbreaks in the southeastern states namely Georgia and Florida.

Symptoms caused by this pathogen vary based on the specific host cultivar; however, a majority of the symptoms are very similar between the different hosts. Symptoms usually include various degrees of mottling, chlorosis, curling, dwarfing, and distortion of the fruit, leaves, and even whole plants. The symptoms on fruit include: a reduction in size, mottling and color changes, and an obvious distorted and lumpy appearance. Also, many times brown necrotic streaks or splotches can be seen on the leaves and fruit. The symptoms can easily be seen on new growth, and they are far more pronounced if the plant was infected when it was young rather than when it was older.

== Disease transmission ==
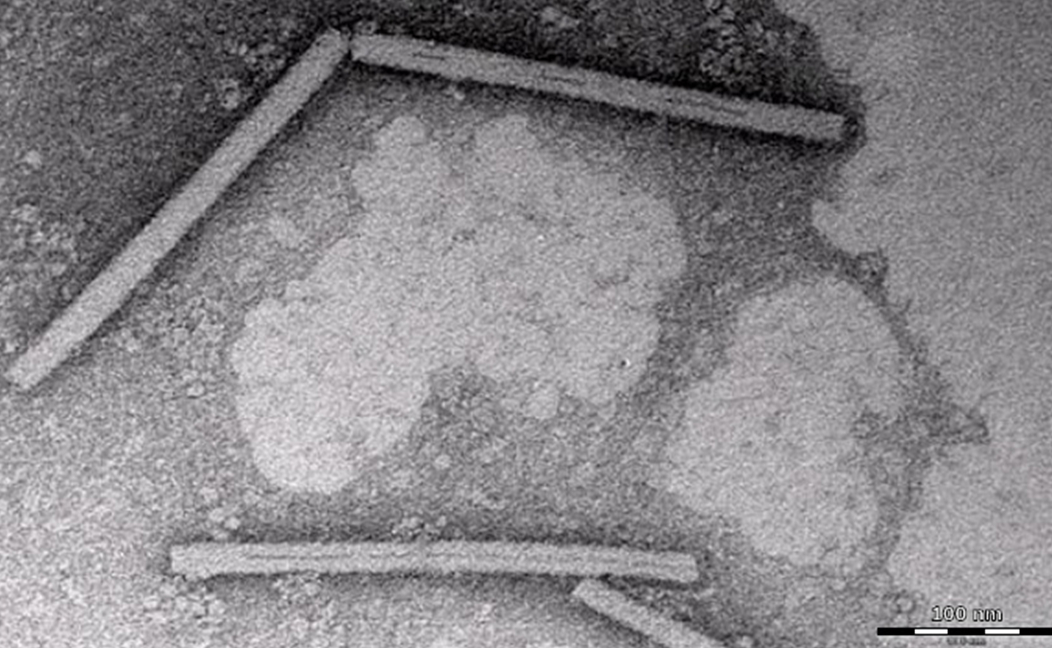
Electron micrograph of PMMoV

PMMoV is a rigid rod shaped virus pathogen that can be easily transmitted to healthy plants via mechanical inoculation or contact between plants or another medium that can carry the pathogen such as hands, gloves, and clothing. The virus is commonly found on the outer seed coat and very rarely in the endosperm of seeds of the infected plants. Being seedborne, the virus primarily infects through mechanical contamination during seed transplanting and other agricultural procedures. It enters the plant/seed through microscopic abrasions or wounds. The virus is in vitro, which in this case means it can survive in an isolated environment, and being highly infectious it can easily be transmitted during normal crop maintenance. PMMoV is exceptionally stable and it is known to survive for extended periods of time in plant debris and on greenhouse structures, pots, and horticultural tools. There are no known insect vectors; however, humans can be considered the main vector for this pathogen.

== Environment ==
The virus is widespread and is found almost anywhere peppers are grown, this is because the virus is most often introduced with the pepper seed. The virus moves long distances on the seed and moves short distances via plant-to-plant contact, handling of plants by contaminated implements and workers aids in the spread of the virus. Soils with low organic matter content, specifically humus will much more readily promote the adsorption of PMMoV. Specifically, the allophanic clays and iron minerals in these soils will promote the adsorption of PMMoV.

Disease incidence has occurred mainly in greenhouse environments and hot, humid environments like southwest and southeast Florida and in regions like North Africa, and Japan. This is an indication of the type of soil that is optimal for the virus; warm or hot and humid. Greenhouses, specifically, are an ideal production environment for rapid spread of the disease.

== Prevention, control and management ==
Structure of methyl bromide, which was used until 2005 when it was banned by the Montreal Protocol

Up until 2005, the primary means of prevention was a pre-plant treatment of bromomethane or methyl bromide. The import and production of this fumigation chemical was banned under the Montreal Protocol. A modern organic method of prevention was found by a Japanese study on soil adsorptions role in the adsorption of PMMoV. The study found that increased humus content in a soil will have an inhibitory effect on PMMoV adsorption.

As with all plant viruses, but especially with those in the genus Tobamovirus, avoidance is the best means of control. Growers must practice good sanitation procedures and only plant clean seeds. Growers must also use caution when handling plants, plants with abrasions or wounds give the virus an opportunity to enter the tissue of the plant. There are no chemical or biological control methods that can be used to control the disease once the plant is infected. Though often a challenge, accurate identification of PMMoV is key to successful control of the disease.

Diseased plant material will remain infectious until completely broken down. Tillage, increased irrigation, and high temperatures encourage the breakdown of plant material in the soil. Any infected plant material in the soil can serve as a source of inoculum for subsequent crops so crop rotation should be practiced, if possible. Volunteer peppers and weeds, particularly those in the family Solanaceae (such as nightshades), should be removed to reduce possible sources of infections. Due to the fact that smoke can spread the disease, burial or composting of the diseased plants should be implemented rather than burning. The composted diseased plant remains should not be used on a pepper crop or other Solanaceous crops.

== Importance ==
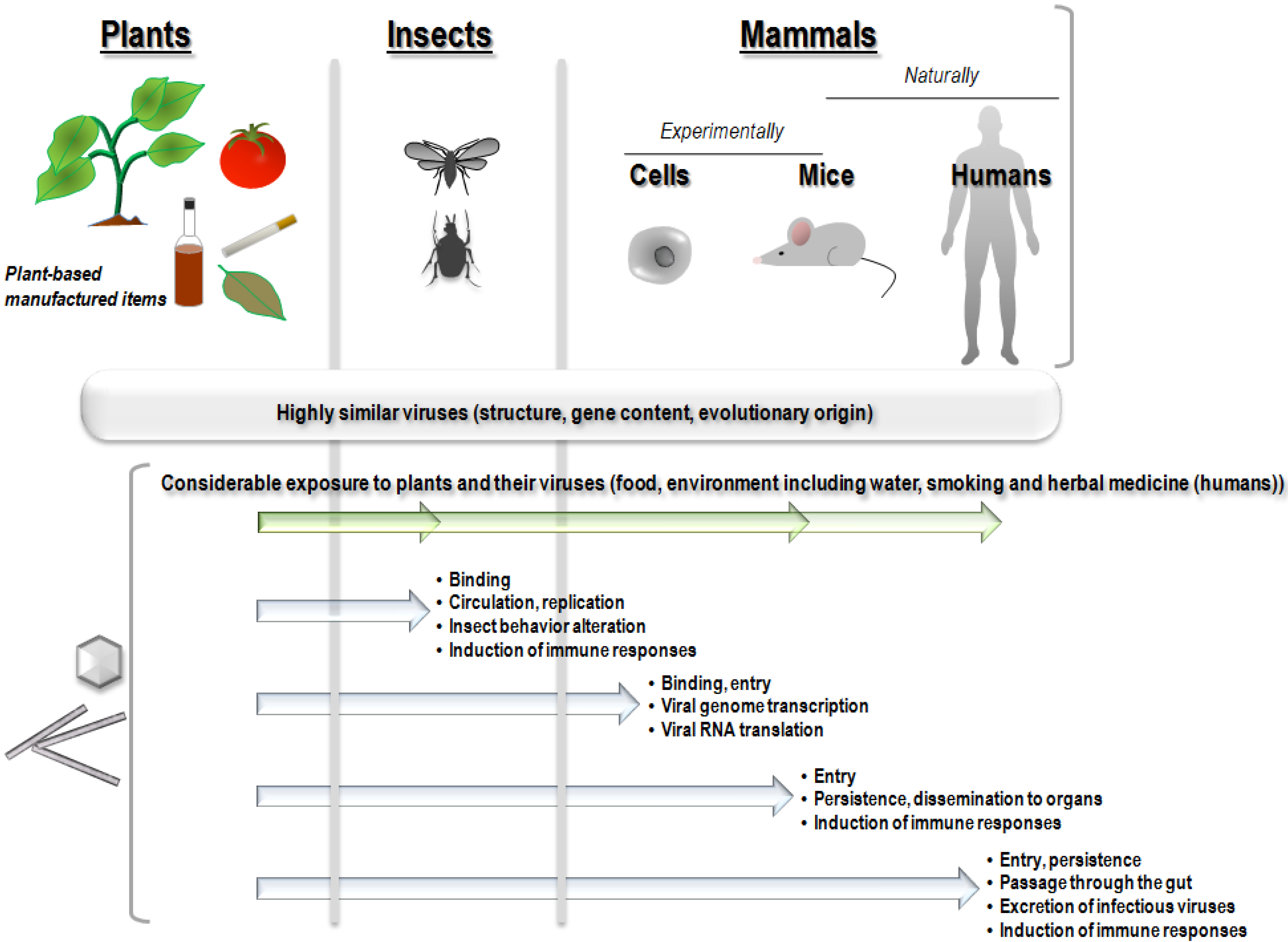
Findings supporting border crossing for plant viruses into the invertebrate and vertebrate worlds

Controlling the virus is important for pepper production worldwide, but recent research shows that this plant disease may be transmitted to humans.

PMMoV is an indicator of fecal pollution in the environment. An early study set in the United States and Singapore detected PMMoV in fecal samples from most participants, at concentrations up to 10^{9} copies per gram of dry feces and is consistently found in wastewater from around the world at concentrations greater than 1 million copies per milliliter of raw sewage. Quantitative PCR is used to determine the abundance of PMMoV in raw sewage, treated wastewater, seawater exposed to wastewater, and fecal samples and/or intestinal homogenates from a wide variety of animals.

PMMoV is commonly found in surface waters impacted by anthropogenic activity (namely wastewater), such as in groundwater, streams, lakes, rivers, esturaries and some oceans. PMMoV is found in drinking water, including at trace levels in countries such as the USA, Japan and Sweden. Compared to other indicator viruses and bacteria associated with wastewater such as Escherichia coli or adenovirus, PMMoV is more resistant to established water and wastewater treatment processes, making it ideal for tracking anthropogenic pollution in the environment.
