= Maracuja mosaic virus =

Virus classification
- (unranked): Virus
- Realm: Riboviria
- Kingdom: Orthornavirae
- Phylum: Kitrinoviricota
- Class: Alsuviricetes
- Order: Martellivirales
- Family: Virgaviridae
- Genus: Tobamovirus
- Species: Tobamovirus maracujae

Species of virus

Maracujá mosaic virus (MarMV) is a virus that infects Passiflora species. Symptoms include leaf mosaic and crinkle. Virus particles are 320 nm long and 18 nm in diameter. Transmission occurs by contact between plants.
