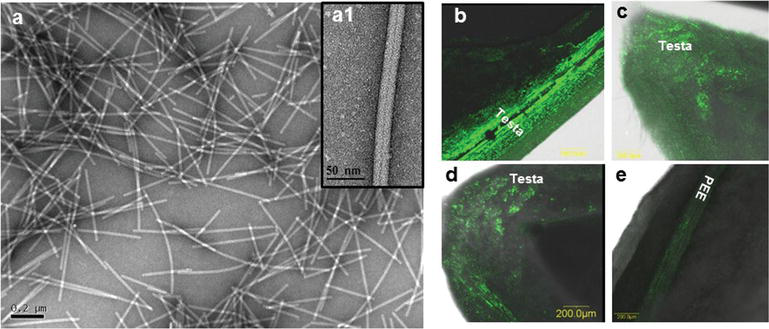
- Electron micrograph of CGMMV virions and localization in cucurbit seeds

Virus classification
- (unranked): Virus
- Realm: Riboviria
- Kingdom: Orthornavirae
- Phylum: Kitrinoviricota
- Class: Alsuviricetes
- Order: Martellivirales
- Family: Virgaviridae
- Genus: Tobamovirus
- Species: Tobamovirus viridimaculae

Synonyms
- Bottlegourd Indian mosaic virus; Cucumber virus 3; Cucumber virus 4; Cucumis virus 2; Tobacco mosaic virus watermelon strain—W

= Cucumber green mottle mosaic virus =

Species of virus

Cucumber green mottle mosaic virus (CGMMV) is a plant pathogenic virus. In Europe this virus disease is found since 1935. Watermelon and melon are also susceptible to this virus.

== Symptoms ==
The virus affects the young leaves with green and light green spots, even yellow-green spots. These spots have a slower development rate than the rest of the leaf. Sometimes the veins remain green. In heavy infection young leaves are even deformed. The activity of the virus is reduced when the leaf ages. Fruit drop (abortion) is common. The rest of the fruits are small. Yield is reduced by 25% even more if no control action are taken into account. In the epidermis of the sick plants characteristic structures can be seen easily with a microscope.

Virus ID: Tobamovirus group. Temperature inactivation in juice 90 °C Transition: seed 8–10% from the beginning which is enough to star the silent infection. Aphids and other sucking insects do not transmit the virus. In hydroponic the virus could spread out to up to 80% of the crop because the roots are touching.

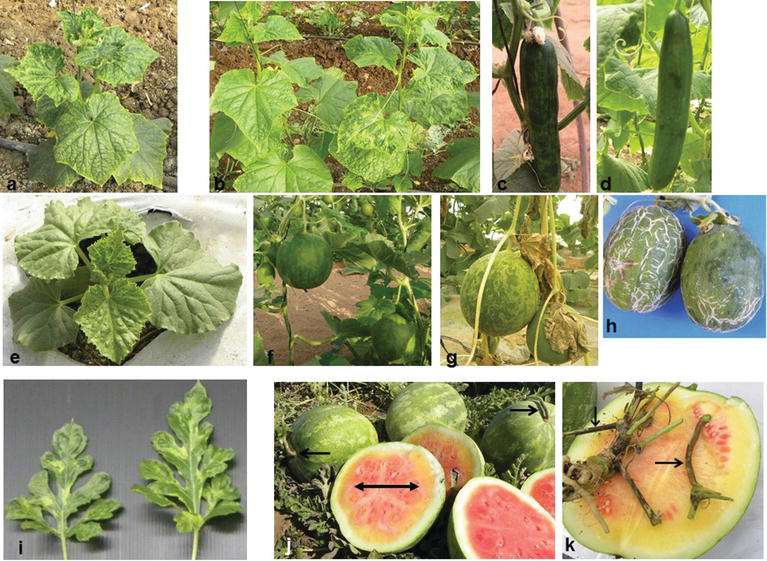
Cucumber green mottle mosaic virus-infected cucurbit species

== Transmission ==
Whether CGMMV is transmitted by pollen and pollinators is an open question. Liu et al., 2014 demonstrate simulated pollination does transmit vertically to the seed however this does not distinguish between mechanical transmission by the simulated pollination equipment and true vertical transmission within the pollen. A fluorescent in situ hybridization (FISH) study performed by Shargil et al., 2015 does show CGMMV in the pollen sac but finds none in the pollen itself. Further research is needed to determine the precise route(s) of transmission.
