= Pea early browning virus =

Virus classification
- (unranked): Virus
- Realm: Riboviria
- Kingdom: Orthornavirae
- Phylum: Kitrinoviricota
- Class: Alsuviricetes
- Order: Martellivirales
- Family: Virgaviridae
- Genus: Tobravirus
- Species: Tobravirus pisi

Synonyms
- broad bean yellow band virus

Species of virus

Pea early browning virus (PEBV) is a plant pathogenic virus.
