= Peanut clump virus =

Virus classification
- (unranked): Virus
- Realm: Riboviria
- Kingdom: Orthornavirae
- Phylum: Kitrinoviricota
- Class: Alsuviricetes
- Order: Martellivirales
- Family: Virgaviridae
- Genus: Pecluvirus
- Species: Pecluvirus arachidis

Species of plant pathogenic virus

Peanut clump virus (PCV) is a plant pathogenic virus. It is assigned to the genus Pecluvirus.
