= Heinz Fraenkel-Conrat =

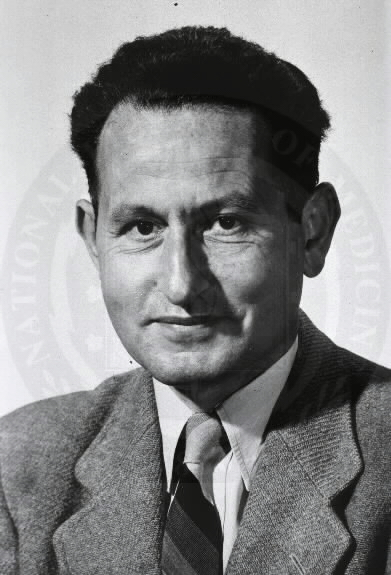
- Heinz Fraenkel-Conrat
- Born: July 29, 1910; Breslau, German Empire (now Wrocław, Poland)
- Died: April 10, 1999 (aged 88); Oakland, California, U.S.
- Citizenship: United States
- Education: University of Breslau, University of Edinburgh
- Known for: Tobacco Mosaic Virus
- Awards: Lasker Award (1958)
- Scientific career
- Fields: Biochemistry
- Workplaces: University of California, Berkeley
- Thesis: Alkaloids of solanum pseudocapsicum

Heinz Ludwig Fraenkel-Conrat (July 29, 1910 – April 10, 1999) was a biochemist, famous for his research on viruses.

== Early life ==
Fraenkel-Conrat was born in Breslau, Germany.

He was the son of Lili Conrat and Professor Ludwig Fraenkel, director of the Women's Clinic of the University of Breslau. His father was a prominent gynecologist and medical researcher who published regarding endocrine function, social gynecology, and sexology during the first decades of the 20th century, and was one of many scientists summarily dismissed from their positions by the Nazis.

== Academic career ==
He received an MD from the University of Breslau in 1933. Due to the rise of Nazism in Germany he left for Scotland in 1933 and finished his PhD at the University of Edinburgh (1936). After completing his doctorate, he emigrated to the United States, becoming a naturalized citizen in 1941. In the 1940s Fraenkel-Conrat visited his sister and brother-in-law, biochemist Karl Slotta, a pioneer in the study of progesterone, estriol, and medical use of venom, who was then director of the Chemical Institute of the Instituto Butantan in São Paulo, Brazil, from 1935 to 1948. Frankel-Conrat remained for one year of biochemical research at the Instituto Butantan. He worked at a number of institutes before joining the faculty at the University of California, Berkeley in 1952 where he remained until his death.

His most noted research was on the tobacco mosaic virus (TMV) and the holmes ribgrass virus (HRV). He was described by a colleague as "one of the pioneers in the early days of virology with (his work on) the tobacco mosaic virus." He discovered that the genetic control of viral reproduction was RNA and that it is carried in the nucleic core of each virus. In 1955 he and biophysicist Robley Williams showed that a functional virus could be created out of purified RNA and a protein coat. In 1960 he announced the complete sequencing of the 158 amino acids in the virus.

== Death ==
He died of lung failure on April 10, 1999, at the Kaiser Hospital in Oakland, at the age of eighty-eight.
