= Pecluvirus =

Virus classification
- (unranked): Virus
- Realm: Riboviria
- Kingdom: Orthornavirae
- Phylum: Kitrinoviricota
- Class: Alsuviricetes
- Order: Martellivirales
- Family: Virgaviridae
- Genus: Pecluvirus

Genus of viruses

Pecluvirus is a genus of viruses, in the family Virgaviridae. Cereal crops and graminaceous weeds serve as natural hosts. There are two species in this genus. Diseases associated with this genus include: (SBWMV): green and yellow mosaic. The name of the genus is derived from Peanut clump virus: Peanut clump virus, giving rise to Pecluvirus.

== Taxonomy ==
The following species are assigned to the genus, listed by scientific name and followed by their common names:

- Pecluvirus arachidis, Peanut clump virus
- Pecluvirus indicum, Indian peanut clump virus

== Structure ==
Viruses in the genus Pecluvirus are non-enveloped, with elongated rod-shaped geometries, and helical symmetry. The diameter is around 21 nm, with a length of 245 nm. Genomes are linear and segmented, segments are about 5.9 and 4.8kb in length.

Genus	Structure	Symmetry	Capsid	Genomic arrangement	Genomic segmentation
Pecluvirus	Rod-shaped	Helical	Non-enveloped	Linear	Segmented

== Life cycle ==
Viral replication is cytoplasmic. Entry into the host cell is achieved by penetration into the host cell. Replication follows the positive stranded RNA virus replication model. Positive stranded RNA virus transcription is the method of transcription. Translation takes place by leaky scanning, and suppression of termination. The virus exits the host cell by tripartite non-tubule guided viral movement. Cereal crops and graminaceous weeds serve as the natural host. The virus is transmitted via a vector (fungus). Transmission routes are vector and seed borne.

Genus	Host details	Tissue tropism	Entry details	Release details	Replication site	Assembly site	Transmission
Pecluvirus	Plants	None	Unknown	Viral movement	Cytoplasm	Cytoplasm	Mechanical inoculation: fungus. Mechanical contact; seed
