= Ribgrass mosaic virus =

Virus classification
- (unranked): Virus
- Realm: Riboviria
- Kingdom: Orthornavirae
- Phylum: Kitrinoviricota
- Class: Alsuviricetes
- Order: Martellivirales
- Family: Virgaviridae
- Genus: Tobamovirus
- Species: Tobamovirus plantagonis

Synonyms
- Holmes ribgrass virus (HRV); Plantago virus; Ribgrass strain of tobacco mosaic virus; Youcai mosaic virus

Species of virus

Ribgrass mosaic virus (RMV) is a species of Tobamovirus. It is an RNA-containing virus with rod-shape particles. It can be found in many wild plant species. This virus does not itself produce serious epidemic diseases, but it served as the inciting pathogen of a necrotic virus disease in burly tobacco.
