= Tobravirus =

Virus classification
- (unranked): Virus
- Realm: Riboviria
- Kingdom: Orthornavirae
- Phylum: Kitrinoviricota
- Class: Alsuviricetes
- Order: Martellivirales
- Family: Virgaviridae
- Genus: Tobravirus

Genus of viruses

Tobravirus is a genus of viruses, in the family Virgaviridae. Plants serve as natural hosts. There are three species in this genus. Diseases associated with this genus include: SBWMV: green and yellow mosaic.

== Taxonomy ==
The following species are assigned to the genus, listed by scientific name and followed by their common names:

- Tobravirus capsici, Pepper ringspot virus
- Tobravirus pisi, Pea early-browning virus
- Tobravirus tabaci, Tobacco rattle virus

== Structure ==
Viruses in the genus Tobravirus are non-enveloped, with rod-shaped geometries, and helical symmetry. The diameter is around 22 nm, with two lengths: 46-115 nm and 180–215 nm. Genomes are linear and segmented, bipartite, positive-sense, single-stranded RNA around 26.84.5kb in total length (8600–11300 nucleotides for each length).

Genus	Structure	Symmetry	Capsid	Genomic arrangement	Genomic segmentation
Tobravirus	Rod-shaped	Helical	Non-enveloped	Linear	Segmented

== Life cycle ==
Viral replication is cytoplasmic. Entry into the host cell is achieved by penetration into the host cell. Replication follows the positive stranded RNA virus replication model. Positive stranded RNA virus transcription is the method of transcription. Translation takes place by suppression of termination. The virus exits the host cell by monopartite non-tubule guided viral movement. Plants serve as the natural host. The virus is transmitted via a vector (mechanical nematodes trichodorus and paratrichodorus). Transmission routes are vector and mechanical.

Genus	Host details	Tissue tropism	Entry details	Release details	Replication site	Assembly site	Transmission
Tobravirus	Plants	None	Unknown	Viral movement	Cytoplasm	Cytoplasm	Mechanical inoculation: nematodes
