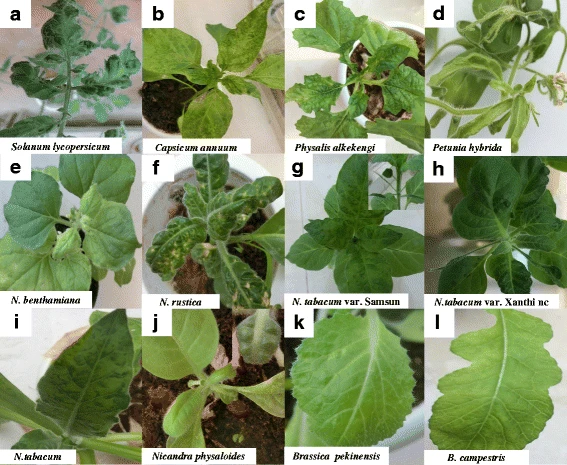

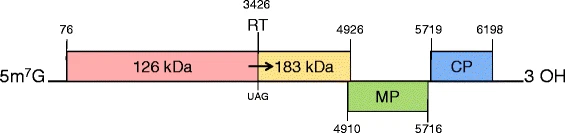
- Symptoms on plants inoculated with ToMV and virus genome

Virus classification
- (unranked): Virus
- Realm: Riboviria
- Kingdom: Orthornavirae
- Phylum: Kitrinoviricota
- Class: Alsuviricetes
- Order: Martellivirales
- Family: Virgaviridae
- Genus: Tobamovirus
- Species: Tobamovirus tomatotessellati

= Tomato mosaic virus =

Species of virus

Tomato mosaic virus (ToMV) is a plant pathogenic virus. It is found worldwide and affects tomatoes and many other plants.

== Symptoms ==
The foliage of affected tomato plants shows mottling, with alternating yellowish and darker green areas, the latter often appearing thicker and raised giving a blister-like appearance. The leaves tend to be fern-like in appearance with pointed tips and younger leaves may be twisted. The fruit may be distorted, yellow blotches and necrotic spots may occur on both ripe and green fruit and there may be internal browning of the fruit wall. In young plants, the infection reduces the set of fruit and may cause distortions and blemishes. The entire plant may be dwarfed and the flowers discoloured. Environmental conditions influence the symptoms. These include temperature, day length and light intensity as well as the variety, the age of the plant at infection and the virulence of the strain of ToMV.

== Host plants ==
Besides Solanaceous plants, such as pepper and petunia, ToMV affects a wide range of other crop and ornamental plants. These include snapdragon, delphinium and marigold and a great many other plants to a lesser extent. The infection is generally restricted to plants that are grown in seedbeds and transplanted as it is in the handling processes that the virus is likely to gain entry. Symptoms on other plant hosts include blistering, chlorosis, curling, distortion, dwarfing and mottling of the leaves.

== Means of infection ==
The virus may be introduced on infected seed. Only a small number of seedlings need to be infected for the virus to spread rapidly. It can also be spread on contaminated tools and the clothing and hands of workers during routine activities.
