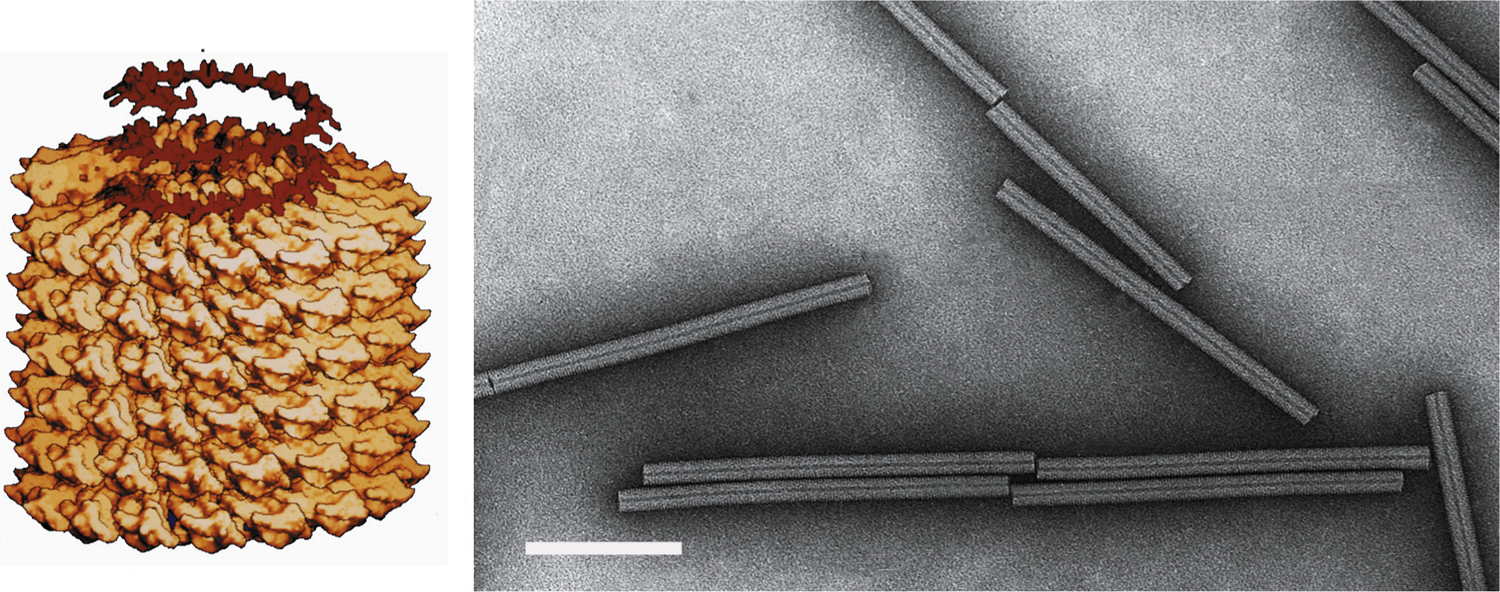
- Tobacco mosaic virus (TMV) diagram and electron micrograph of virions

Virus classification
- (unranked): Virus
- Realm: Riboviria
- Kingdom: Orthornavirae
- Phylum: Kitrinoviricota
- Class: Alsuviricetes
- Order: Martellivirales
- Family: Virgaviridae

Genera
- See text

= Virgaviridae =

Family of viruses

Virgaviridae is a family of positive-strand RNA viruses. Plants serve as natural hosts. The name of the family is derived from the Latin word virga (rod), as all viruses in this family are rod-shaped. There are currently 59 species in this family, divided among seven genera.

== Structure ==
Genus	Structure	Symmetry	Capsid	Genomic arrangement	Genomic segmentation
Tobamovirus	Rod-shaped	Helical	Non-enveloped	Linear	Non-Segmented
Furovirus	Rod-shaped	Helical	Non-enveloped	Linear	Segmented
Pecluvirus	Rod-shaped	Helical	Non-enveloped	Linear	Segmented
Hordeivirus	Rod-shaped	Helical	Non-enveloped	Linear	Segmented
Tobravirus	Rod-shaped	Helical	Non-enveloped	Linear	Segmented
Pomovirus	Rod-shaped	Helical	Non-enveloped	Linear	Segmented

== Life cycle ==
Viral replication is cytoplasmic. Entry into the host cell is achieved by penetration into the host cell. Replication follows the positive stranded RNA virus replication model. Positive stranded RNA virus transcription is the method of transcription. Translation takes place by leaky scanning, and suppression of termination. The virus exits the host cell by tripartite non-tubule guided viral movement, and monopartite non-tubule guided viral movement. Plants serve as the natural host.

Genus	Host details	Tissue tropism	Entry details	Release details	Replication site	Assembly site	Transmission
Tobamovirus	Plants	None	Unknown	Viral movement	Cytoplasm	Cytoplasm	Mechanical
Furovirus	Plants	None	Unknown	Viral movement	Cytoplasm	Cytoplasm	Mechanical inoculation: fungus
Pecluvirus	Plants	None	Unknown	Viral movement	Cytoplasm	Cytoplasm	Mechanical inoculation: fungus. Mechanical contact; seed
Hordeivirus	Plants	None	Unknown	Viral movement	Cytoplasm	Cytoplasm	Mechanical: contact; seed
Tobravirus	Plants	None	Unknown	Viral movement	Cytoplasm	Cytoplasm	Mechanical inoculation: nematodes
Pomovirus	Plants	None	Unknown	Viral movement	Cytoplasm	Cytoplasm	Mechanical inoculation: fungus

== Taxonomy ==
The family contains the following genera:

- Furovirus
- Goravirus
- Hordeivirus
- Pecluvirus
- Pomovirus
- Tobamovirus
- Tobravirus
