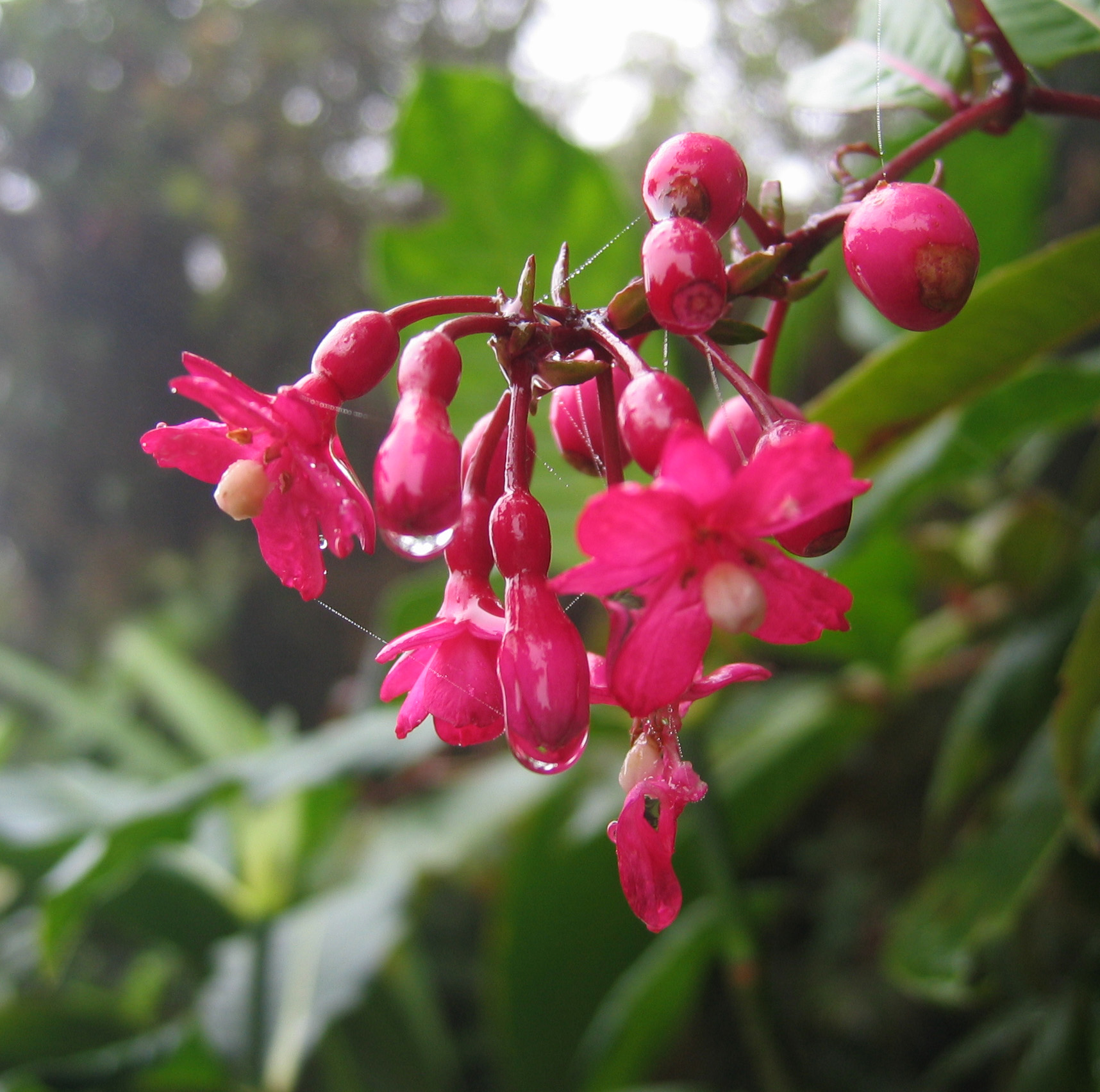

Scientific classification
- Kingdom: Plantae
- Clade: Tracheophytes
- Clade: Angiosperms
- Clade: Eudicots
- Clade: Rosids
- Order: Myrtales
- Family: Onagraceae
- Genus: Fuchsia
- Species: F. jimenezii

Binomial name
- Fuchsia jimenezii Breedlove, P.E.Berry & P.H.Raven

= Fuchsia jimenezii =

Species of flowering plant

Fuchsia jimenezii is a plant of the genus Fuchsia native to Central America. It belongs to the section Jimenezia and is most closely related to the lineage (section Schufia) that gave rise to Fuchsia arborescens and Fuchsia paniculata.
