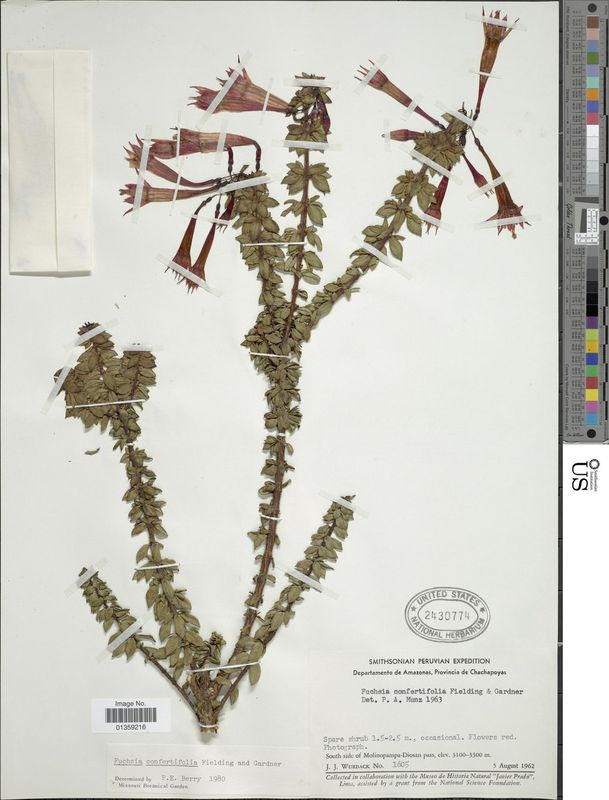

Scientific classification
- Kingdom: Plantae
- Clade: Embryophytes
- Clade: Tracheophytes
- Clade: Spermatophytes
- Clade: Angiosperms
- Clade: Eudicots
- Clade: Rosids
- Order: Myrtales
- Family: Onagraceae
- Genus: Fuchsia
- Species: F. confertifolia

Binomial name
- Fuchsia confertifolia Fielding & Gardner

Synonyms
- Fuchsia dolichantha E.H.L.Krause

= Fuchsia confertifolia =

Species of flowering plant

Fuchsia confertifolia is a species of flowering plant in the family Onagraceae. It is a shrub with sub-leathery leaves, drooping crimson flowers, and tan coloured seeds. The fruits are berries.

Fuchsia confertifolia is native to northern Peru, and was described in 1844.

== Taxonomy ==
The species was described by Henry Borron Fielding and George Gardner in 1844. Within genus Fuchsia, the species is assigned to Section Fuchsia. It forms part of a species group with Fuchsia venusta, Fuchsia rivularis, Fuchsia gehrigeri, Fuchsia llewelynii, and Fuchsia scherffiana.

== Distribution ==
Fuchsia confertifolia is native to the wet tropical biome of northern Peru. It is endemic to cloud forests, and grows on high mountain ridges east of the Utcubamba river. The species is present at elevations of 2,600–3,200 metres (8,500–10,500 ft).

== Description ==
Fuchsia confertifolia is a shrub 1–2.5 metres (3.3–8.2 ft) tall. The branches are cylindrical, 1.5–3 millimetres (0.059–0.118 in) thick, and usually less than 15 centimetres (0.49 ft) long. The bark on older branches is reddish-brown. The larger branches are bare, and the smaller branches are densely covered in leaves.

The leaves are sub-leathery, 8–12 millimetres (0.31–0.47 in) long, and 3–5 millimetres (0.12–0.20 in) wide. The leaf stems are 1–2 millimetres (0.039–0.079 in) long, and are arranged in groups of three. The leaf edges are finely toothed, and turned downwards.

The flowers are crimson, drooping, and have slender 9–15 millimetres (0.35–0.59 in) stems. The flowers are narrow funnels, which are 3.5–5 centimetres (1.4–2.0 in) long, and 0.2–0.4 centimetres (0.079–0.157 in) wide. The sepals are narrowly lanceolate, 13–18 millimetres (0.51–0.71 in) long, and 4–5 millimetres (0.16–0.20 in) wide. The petals are narrowly triangular, 9–14 millimetres (0.35–0.55 in) long, and 2.5–3 millimetres (0.098–0.118 in) wide.

The berries are ellipsoid-ovoid, around 1 centimetre (0.39 in) long, and 0.5–0.7 centimetres (0.20–0.28 in) thick. The seeds are tan, 1.8–1.2 millimetres (0.071–0.047 in) long, and 1–1.2 millimetres (0.039–0.047 in) wide.
