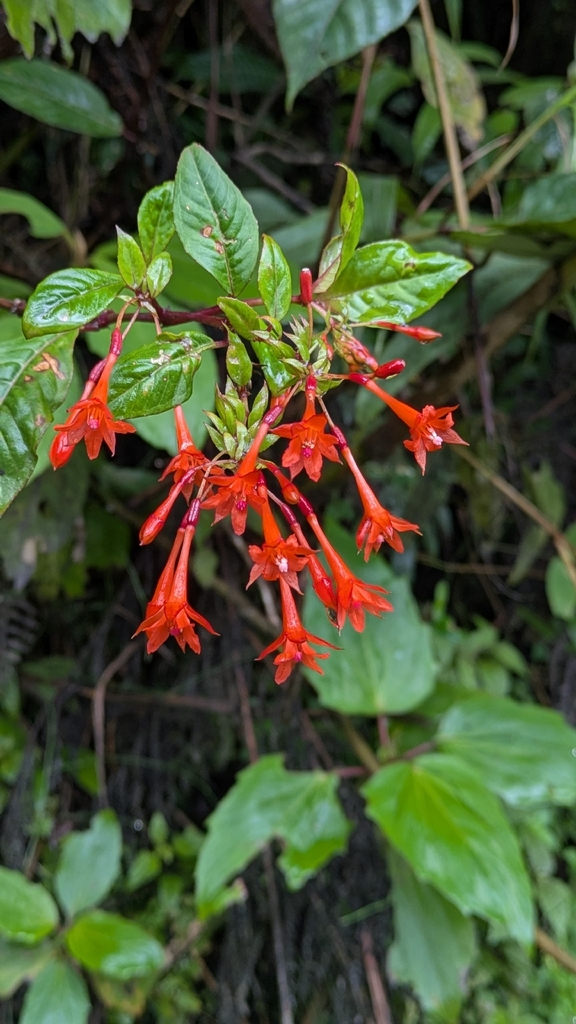

Scientific classification
- Kingdom: Plantae
- Clade: Embryophytes
- Clade: Tracheophytes
- Clade: Angiosperms
- Clade: Eudicots
- Clade: Rosids
- Order: Myrtales
- Family: Onagraceae
- Genus: Fuchsia
- Species: F. putumayensis

Binomial name
- Fuchsia putumayensis Munz

= Fuchsia putumayensis =

Species of flowering plant

Fuchsia putumayensis is a species of flowering plant in the family Onagraceae. It is a shrub or subshrub with firmly membranous leaves, orange-red flowers, and red-purple berries. The species is native to Colombia and Ecuador, and was described in 1943.

== Taxonomy ==
The species was described by Philip A. Munz in 1943.

Fuchsia putumayensis is part of the section Fuchsia. It forms part of a species group with Fuchsia lehmannii, Fuchsia andrei, Fuchsia cuatrecasaii, and Fuchsia abrupta.

== Distribution ==
Fuchsia putumayensis is native to the wet tropical biome of Colombia and Ecuador. It grows in the cloud forests of the Colombian Cordillera Occidental, and on the eastern Cordillera Central. The species is present at elevations of 1,400–2,100 metres (4,600–6,900 ft).

Fuchsia putumayensis occurs sympatrically with Fuchsia cuatrecasaii and Fuchsia macrostigma.

== Description ==
Fuchsia putumayensis is a shrub or subshrub. It grows 1–3 metres (3.3–9.8 ft) high. The young branchlets are cylindrical, green to dull purple, and covered in minute hairs. The older stems are pale tan or grey, with finely fissured bark.

The leaves are arranged oppositely, firmly membranous, elliptical, 6–15 centimetres (2.4–5.9 in) long, and 3–7 centimetres (1.2–2.8 in) wide. The leaf stems are 6–15 millimetres (0.24–0.59 in) long.

The inflorescences are racemes with numerous flowers. The flower stems are 8–25 millimetres (0.31–0.98 in) long. The flowers are orange-red. The floral tube is a narrow funnel that measures 15–27 millimetres (0.59–1.06 in) long, 2–2.5 millimetres (0.079–0.098 in) wide at the base, and 4–7 millimetres (0.16–0.28 in) wide at the rim. The sepals are tapering, 8–11 millimetres (0.31–0.43 in), and 3–5 millimetres (0.12–0.20 in) wide. The petals are elliptical-oblong, 6–9 millimetres (0.24–0.35 in), and 3–4 millimetres (0.12–0.16 in) wide.

The fruit is a red-purple, oblong-ellipsoid berry, measuring 10–12 millimetres (0.39–0.47 in) long, and 5–9 millimetres (0.20–0.35 in) wide. The seeds are tan coloured, 1–1.2 millimetres (0.039–0.047 in) long, and 0.6–0.8 millimetres (0.024–0.031 in) wide.

== Hybrids ==
Fuchsia putumayensis hybridises with Fuchsia nigricans. The two species occur sympatrically.
