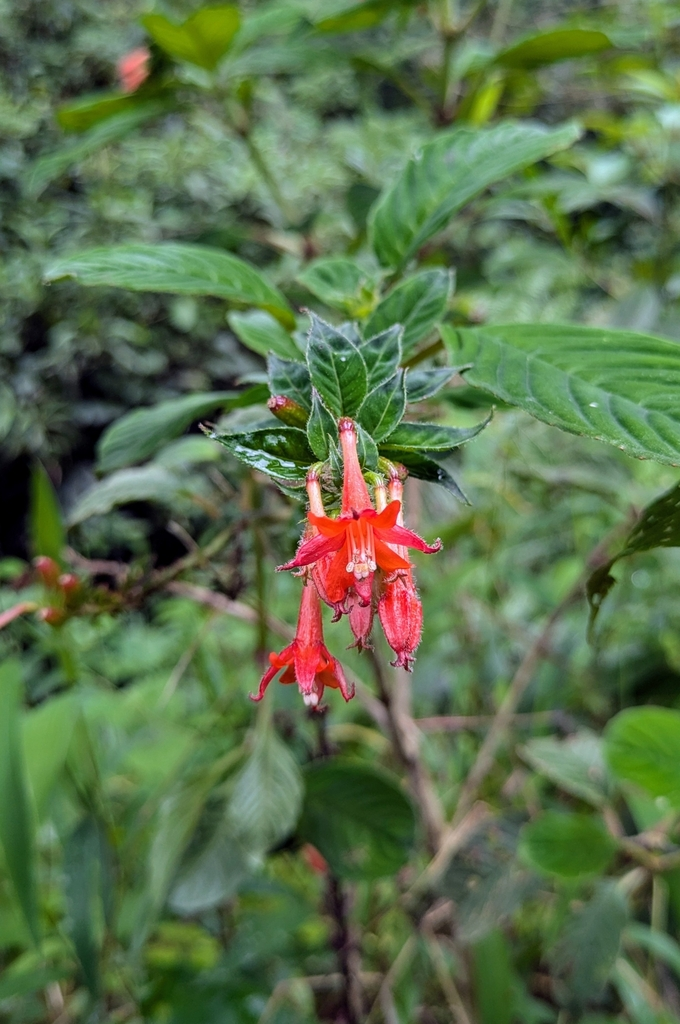

Scientific classification
- Kingdom: Plantae
- Clade: Embryophytes
- Clade: Tracheophytes
- Clade: Angiosperms
- Clade: Eudicots
- Clade: Rosids
- Order: Myrtales
- Family: Onagraceae
- Genus: Fuchsia
- Species: F. pilosa

Binomial name
- Fuchsia pilosa Fielding & Gardner

Synonyms
- Fuchsia asperifolia E.H.L.Krause

= Fuchsia pilosa =

Species of flowering plant

Fuchsia pilosa is a species of flowering plant in the family Onagraceae. It is a shrub or subshrub with elliptical to oblanceolate leaves, drooping inflorescences with orange-red flowers, and reddish berries. The species is endemic to Peru, and was described in 1844.

== Taxonomy ==
The species was described by Henry Borron Fielding & George Gardner in 1844.

Fuchsia pilosa is part of a species group with Fuchsia macrophylla, Fuchsia macropetala, and Fuchsia ovalis.

== Distribution ==
Fuchsia pilosa is native to the wet tropical biome of northern Peru, and is endemic to Amazonas. It grows in cloud forests, east of the Utcubamba river, at elevations of 1,600–2,400 metres (5,200–7,900 ft).

Fuchsia pilosa grows near Fuchsia rivularis, and their stems may be entangled, though the species are not known to hybridise.

== Description ==
Fuchsia pilosa is a shrub or subshrub. It grows 1–2 metres (3.3–6.6 ft) high. The younger branches usually have whitish hairs. The older branches are smooth, light tan in colour, and finely striped.

The leaves are elliptical to oblanceolate, 5–16 centimetres (2.0–6.3 in) long, 2–7 centimetres (0.79–2.76 in) wide, and matte green on both sides. The leaf stems are 12–60 millimetres (0.47–2.36 in) long.

The inflorescences are drooping racemes, and have many flowers crowded at their tips. The flower stems are 3–5 millimetres (0.12–0.20 in) long. The flowers are orange-red. The floral tube is slightly hairy on the outside, narrowly funnel-shaped, 16–20 millimetres (0.63–0.79 in) long, around 2 millimetres (0.079 in) wide at the base, and around 4–5 millimetres (0.16–0.20 in) wide at the rim. The sepals are tapering, 6–8 millimetres (0.24–0.31 in) long, and 2.5–3 millimetres (0.098–0.118 in) wide. The petals are oblong-elliptical, 6–8 millimetres (0.24–0.31 in) long, and 3–4 millimetres (0.12–0.16 in) wide.

The fruit is a reddish, oblong-ellipsoid berry, with four grooves before maturity. The berry is 15–19 millimetres (0.59–0.75 in) long, 10–12 millimetres (0.39–0.47 in) thick, and slightly hairy. The seeds are tan, around 1.5 millimetres (0.059 in) long, and 0.9–1 millimetre (0.035–0.039 in) wide.
