= F. orientalis =

F. orientalis may refer to:

- Fagus orientalis, the Oriental beech, a deciduous tree species found from northwest Turkey east to the Caucasus and Alborz Mountains
- Fritillaria orientalis, a monocotyledon plant species
- Fuchsia orientalis, a plant species endemic to Ecuador

== See also ==
- Orientalis (disambiguation)
