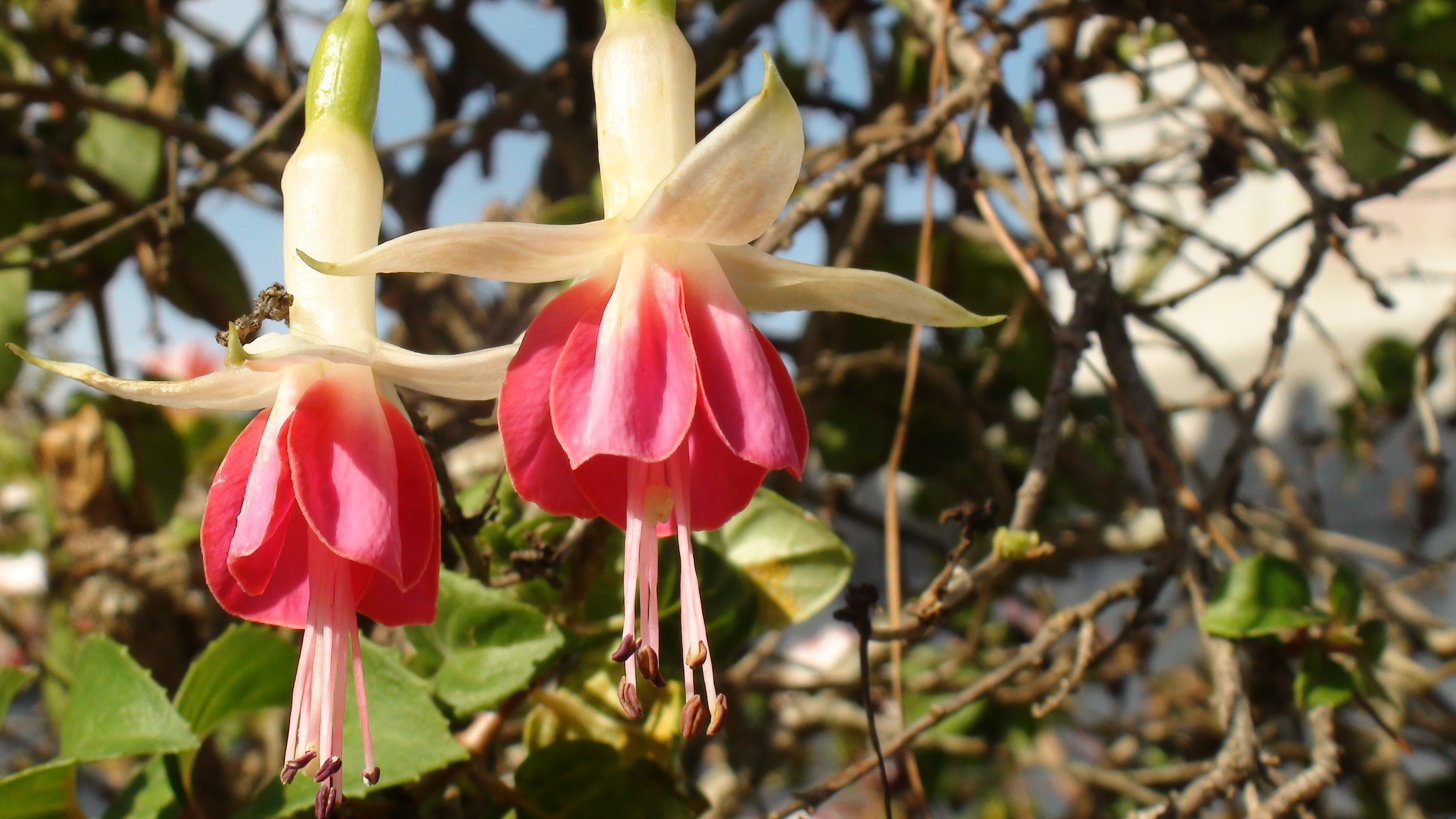
- Fuchsia hybrid

Scientific classification
- Kingdom: Plantae
- Clade: Tracheophytes
- Clade: Angiosperms
- Clade: Eudicots
- Clade: Rosids
- Order: Myrtales
- Family: Onagraceae
- Subfamily: Onagroideae
- Tribe: Circaeeae
- Genus: Fuchsia; L.

Species
- About 100; see text.

Synonyms
- List: Brebissonia Spach; Dorvalia Hoffmanns.; Ellobium Lilja; Encliandra Zucc.; Kierschlegeria Spach; Lyciopsis Spach; Myrinia Lilja; Nahusia Schneev.; Quelusia Vand.; Quiliusa Hook.f.; Schufia Spach; Skinnera J.R.Forst. & G.Forst.; Spachea A. Juss.; Spachia Lilja; Thilcum Molina; Tilco Adans.

= Fuchsia =

Genus of plants

Fuchsia (/ˈfjuːʃə/ FEW-shə) is a genus of flowering plants that consists mostly of shrubs or small trees.

Almost 110 species of Fuchsia are recognized; the vast majority are native to South America, but a few occur north through Central America to Mexico, and also several from New Zealand to Tahiti. One species, F. magellanica, extends as far as the southern tip of South America, occurring on Tierra del Fuego in the cool temperate zone, but the majority are tropical or subtropical.

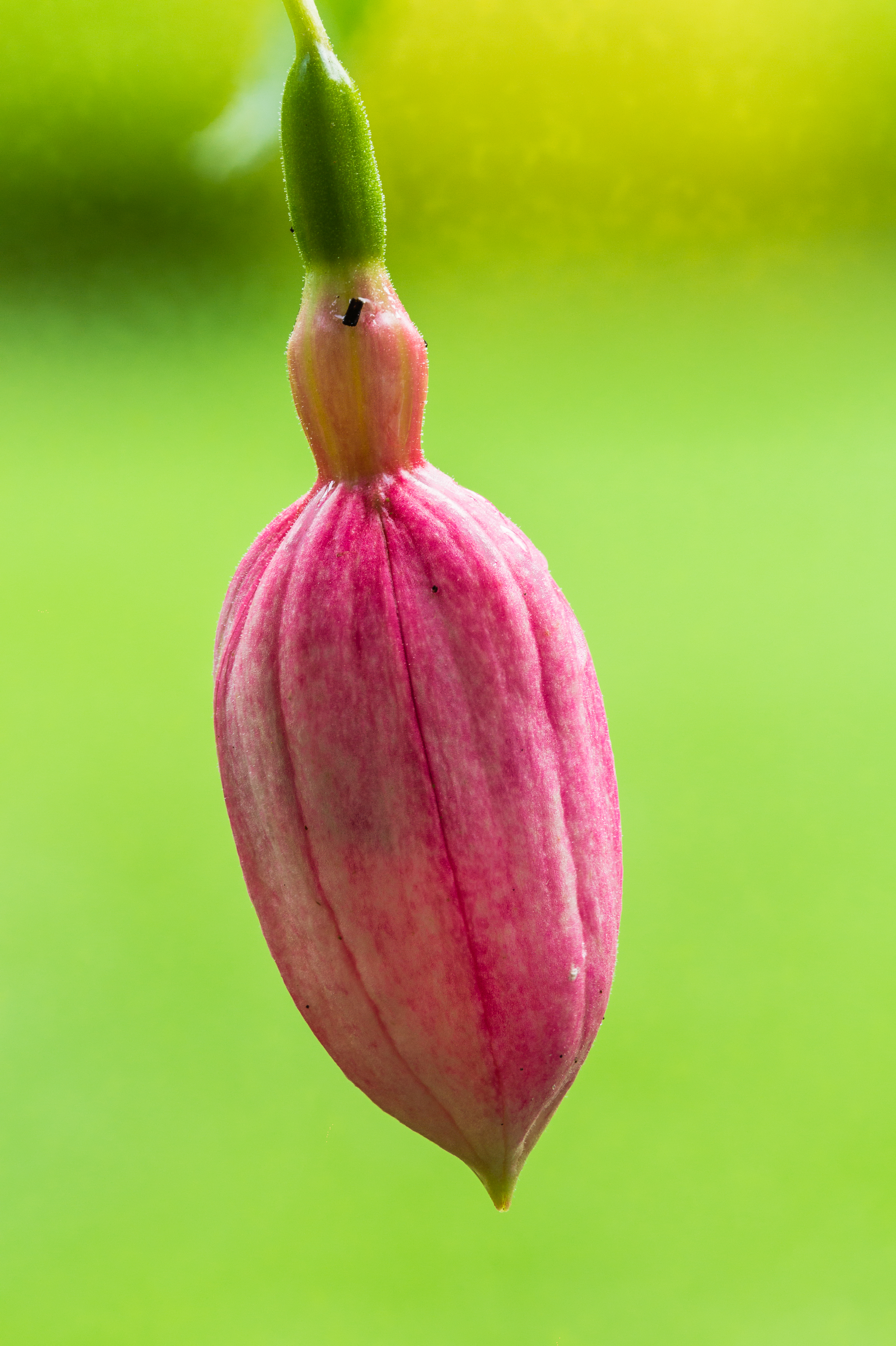
Flower bud of a Fuchsia cultivar Origami.

== Taxonomy ==
The first to be scientifically described, Fuchsia triphylla, was discovered on the Caribbean island of Hispaniola (Haiti and the Dominican Republic) about 1696–1697 by the French Minim friar and botanist, Charles Plumier, during his third expedition to the Greater Antilles. He named the new genus after German botanist Leonhart Fuchs (1501–1566, pronounced [fʊks]).

The fuchsias are most closely related to the northern hemisphere genus Circaea, the two lineages having diverged around 41 million years ago. The presence of Fuchsia in both the Neotropics and the islands of New Zealand and Tahiti likely owes to several dispersal events of Fuchsia across the Antarctic land bridge during the Late Eocene.

== Description ==
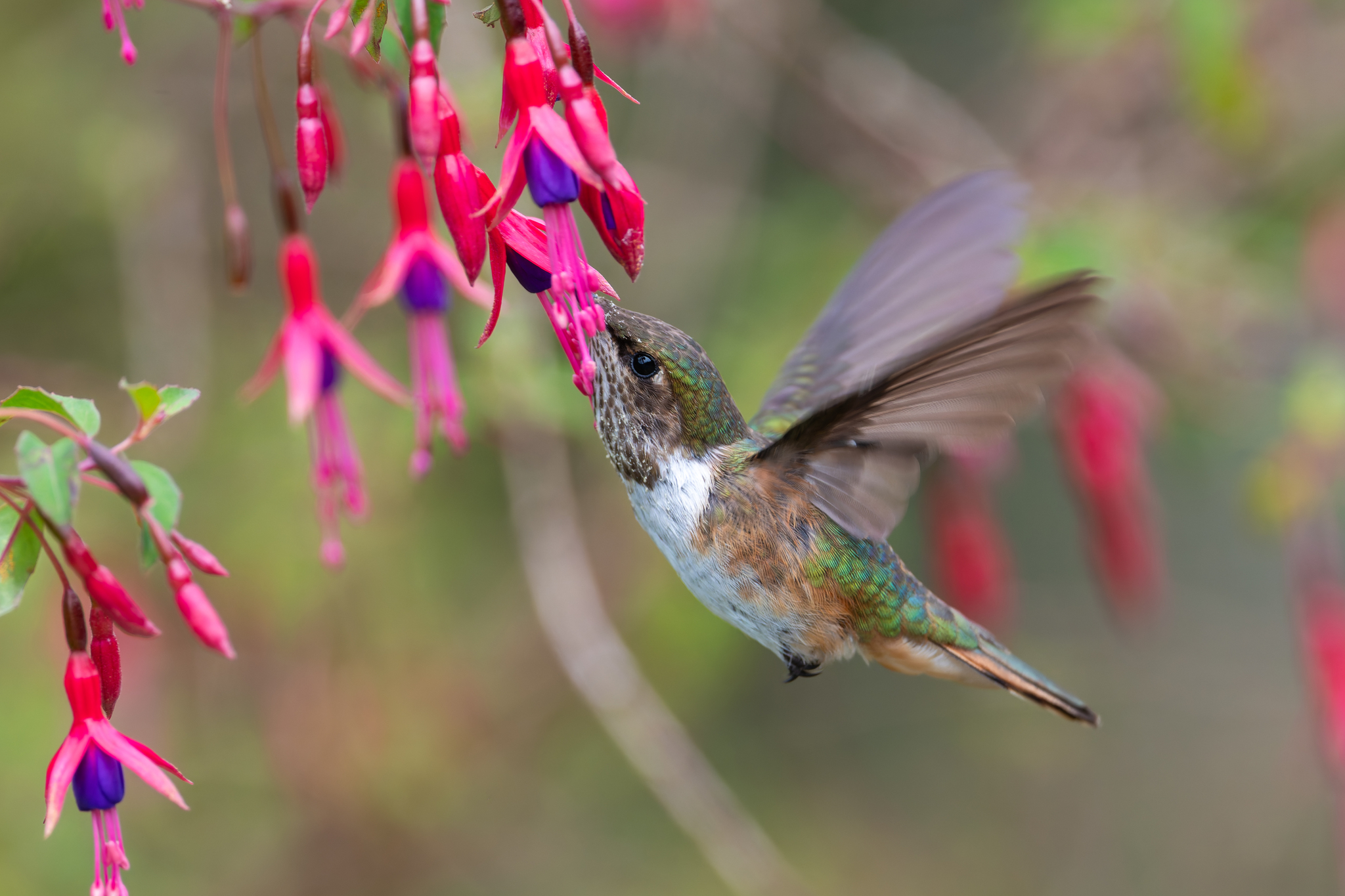
Volcano hummingbird feeding from a Fuchsia flower, in Costa Rica.

Fuchsias prefer climates with cool temperatures all year round with no frost; they prefer partial shade and warm temperatures in the morning in most other areas. They need plenty of watering to grow well.

Most fuchsias are shrubs from 0.2 to 4 m (8 in to 13 ft 1 in) tall, but one New Zealand species, the kōtukutuku (F. excorticata), is unusual in the genus in being a tree, growing up to 12–15 m (39–49 ft) tall. Fuchsia leaves are opposite or in whorls of three to five, simple lanceolate, and usually have serrated margins (entire in some species), 1–25 cm long, and can be either deciduous or evergreen, depending on the species.

The flowers are very decorative; they have a pendulous teardrop shape and are displayed in profusion from late spring throughout the summer and early autumn in 12 weeks, and all year in tropical species. They have four long, slender sepals and four shorter, broader petals; in many species, the sepals are bright red and the petals purple (colours that attract the hummingbirds that pollinate them), but the colours can vary from white to dark red, purple-blue, and orange or salmon. A few have yellowish tones. The ovary is inferior.

The fruit is a small (5–25 mm) dark reddish green, deep red, or deep purple berry, containing numerous very small seeds. The fruit of the berry of F. splendens is reportedly among the best-tasting with a flavor is reminiscent of citrus and black pepper, and it can be made into jam. F. excorticata fruit have a pleasant sweet taste with a slight astringency. Fruit of some other fuchsias however are flavorless or leave a bad aftertaste.

In most species, the flowers are bird-pollinated and the seeds dispersed also by birds.

== Species ==
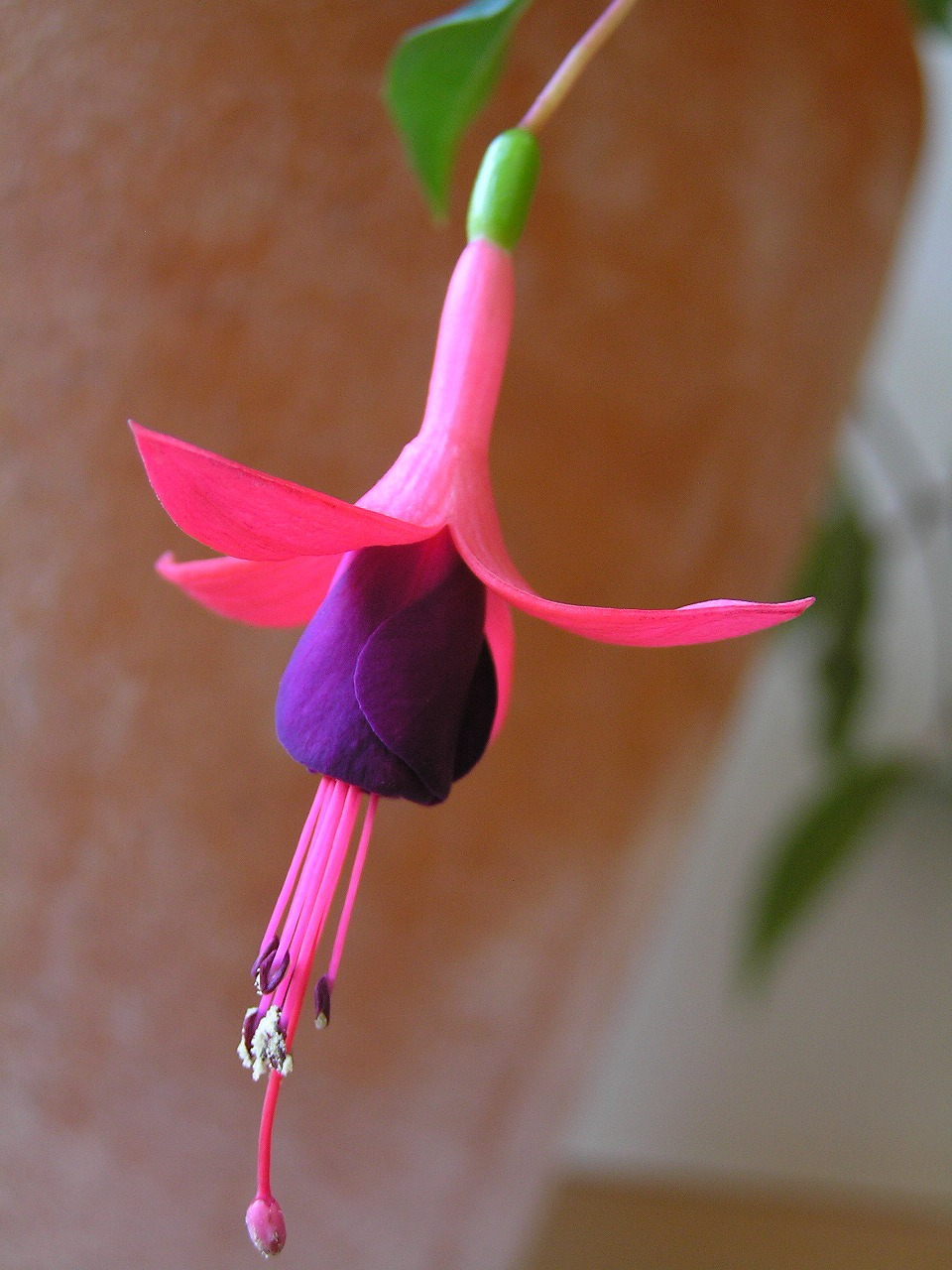
Fuchsia sp. in Japan

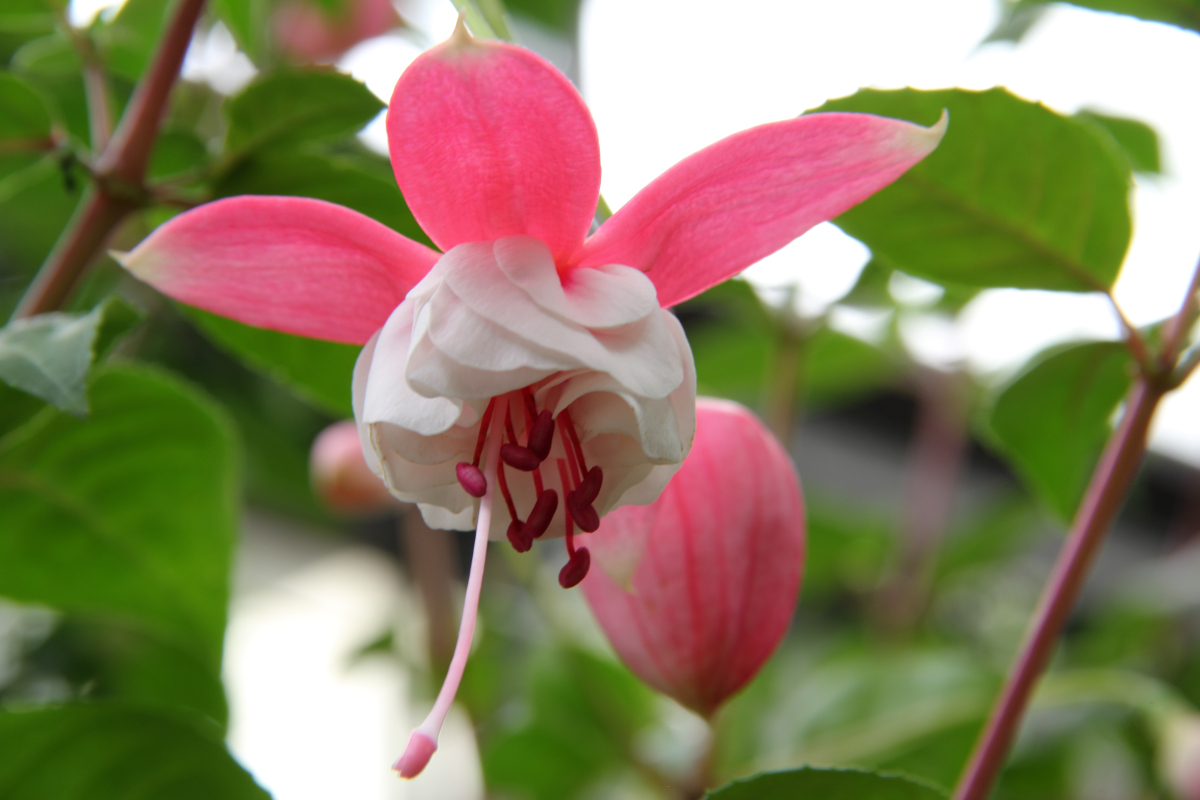
Fuchsia hybrid

The majority of Fuchsia species are native to Central and South America. A small additional number are found on Hispaniola (two species), in New Zealand (three species) and on Tahiti (one species). Philip A. Munz in his A Revision of the Genus Fuchsia classified the genus into seven sections of 100 species. More recent scientific publications, especially those by the botanists Dennis E. Breedlove of the University of California and, currently, Paul E. Berry of the University of Michigan, recognize 108 species and 122 taxa, organized into 12 sections. In New Zealand and Tahiti, section Skinnera now consists of only three species as F. × colensoi has been determined to be a naturally occurring hybrid between F. excorticata and F. perscandens. Also, F. procumbens has been placed into its own section, Procumbentes. Two other new sections are Pachyrrhiza and Verrucosa, each with one species. The Plant List, a cooperative endeavor by several leading botanical institutions to maintain a working list of all plant species, lists most currently accepted Fuchsia species and synonyms.

The vast majority of garden hybrids have descended from a few parent species.

=== Section Ellobium ===
Mexico and Costa Rica. This section contains three species.

- Fuchsia decidua
- Fuchsia fulgens
- Fuchsia splendens

=== Section Encliandra ===
Mexico to Panama. Flowers on the six species in this section have flat petals and short stamens and are reflexed into the tube. Fruits contain few seeds.

- Fuchsia encliandra
  - Fuchsia encliandra subsp. encliandra
  - Fuchsia encliandra subsp. microphyloides
  - Fuchsia encliandra subsp. tetradactyla
- Fuchsia microphylla
  - Fuchsia microphylla subsp. aprica
  - Fuchsia microphylla subsp. chiapensis
  - Fuchsia microphylla subsp. hemsleyana
  - Fuchsia microphylla subsp. hidalgensis
  - Fuchsia microphylla subsp. microphylla
  - Fuchsia microphylla subsp. quercertorum
- Fuchsia obconica
- Fuchsia parviflora
- Fuchsia ravenii
- Fuchsia thymifolia
  - Fuchsia thymifolia subsp. minimiflora
  - Fuchsia thymifolia subsp. thymiflora
- Fuchsia × bacillaris

=== Section Fuchsia ===
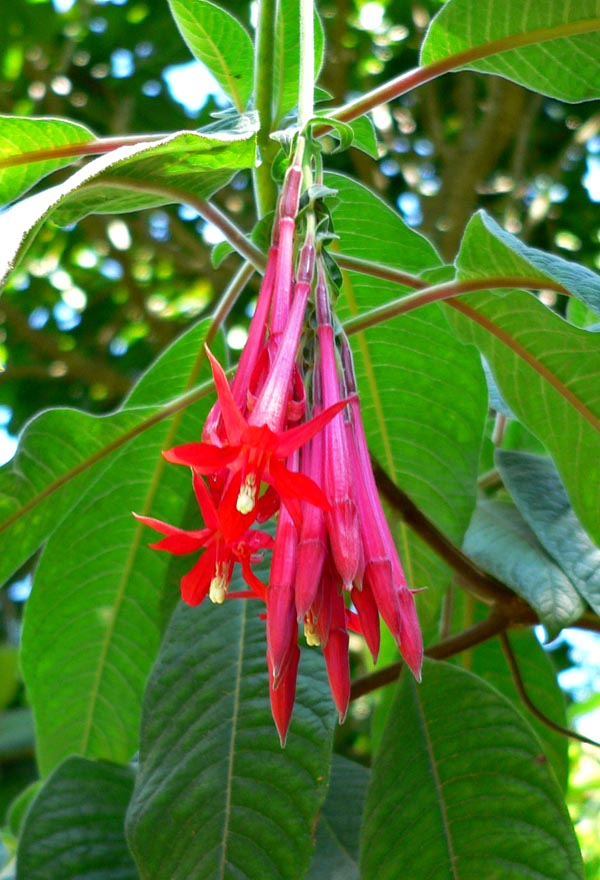
Fuchsia boliviana

Northern Argentina to Colombia and Venezuela, and Hispaniola. With 64 currently recognized species, Sect. Fuchsia (syn. Eufuchsia) is the largest section within the genus. The flowers are perfect, with convolute petals. The stamens are erect and may or may not be exserted from the corolla; the stamens opposite the petals are shorter. The fruit has many seeds.

- Fuchsia abrupta
- Fuchsia ampliata
- Fuchsia andrei
- Fuchsia aquaviridis
- Fuchsia austromontana
- Fuchsia ayavacensis
- Fuchsia boliviana
- Fuchsia campii
- Fuchsia canescens
- Fuchsia caucana
- Fuchsia ceracea
- Fuchsia cinerea
- Fuchsia cochabambana
- Fuchsia confertifolia
- Fuchsia coriacifolia
- Fuchsia corollata
- Fuchsia corymbiflora
- Fuchsia crassistipula
- Fuchsia cuatrecasaii
- Fuchsia decussata
- Fuchsia denticulata
- Fuchsia dependens
- Fuchsia ferreyrae
- Fuchsia fontinalis
- Fuchsia furfuracea
- Fuchsia gehrigeri
- Fuchsia glaberrima
- Fuchsia harlingii
- Fuchsia hartwegii
- Fuchsia hirtella
- Fuchsia hypoleuca
- Fuchsia lehmannii
- Fuchsia llewelynii
- Fuchsia loxensis
- Fuchsia macrophylla
- Fuchsia macropetala
- Fuchsia macrostigma
- Fuchsia magdalenae
- Fuchsia mathewsii
- Fuchsia nigricans
- Fuchsia orientalis
- Fuchsia ovalis
- Fuchsia pallescens
- Fuchsia petiolaris
- Fuchsia pilosa
- Fuchsia polyantha
- Fuchsia pringsheimii
- Fuchsia putumayensis
- Fuchsia rivularis
  - Fuchsia rivularis subsp. pubescens
  - Fuchsia rivularis subsp. rivularis
- Fuchsia sanctae-rosae
- Fuchsia sanmartina
- Fuchsia scabriuscula
- Fuchsia scherffiana
- Fuchsia sessifolia
- Fuchsia simplicicaulis
- Fuchsia steyermarkii
- Fuchsia summa
- Fuchsia sylvatica
- Fuchsia tincta
- Fuchsia triphylla
- Fuchsia vargasiana
- Fuchsia venusta
- Fuchsia vulcanica
- Fuchsia wurdackii

=== Section Hemsleyella ===
Venezuela to Bolivia. The fifteen species in this section are characterised by a nectary that is fused with the base of the flower tube and petals that are partly or completely lacking.

- Fuchsia apetala
- Fuchsia cestroides
- Fuchsia chloroloba
- Fuchsia garleppiana
- Fuchsia huanucoensis
- Fuchsia inflata
- Fuchsia insignis
- Fuchsia juntasensis
- Fuchsia membranaceae
- Fuchsia mezae
- Fuchsia nana
- Fuchsia pilaloensis
- Fuchsia salicifolia
- Fuchsia tilletiana
- Fuchsia tunariensis

=== Section Jimenezia ===
Panama and Costa Rica.

- Fuchsia jimenezii

=== Section Kierschlegeria ===
Coastal central Chile. This section is made up of a single species with pendulous axillary pedicels. The leaves are sparse. The sepals are reflexed and slightly shorter than the tube.

- Fuchsia lycioides

=== Section Pachyrrhiza ===
Peru.

- Fuchsia pachyrrhiza

=== Section Procumbentes ===
New Zealand.

- Fuchsia procumbens

=== Section Quelusia ===
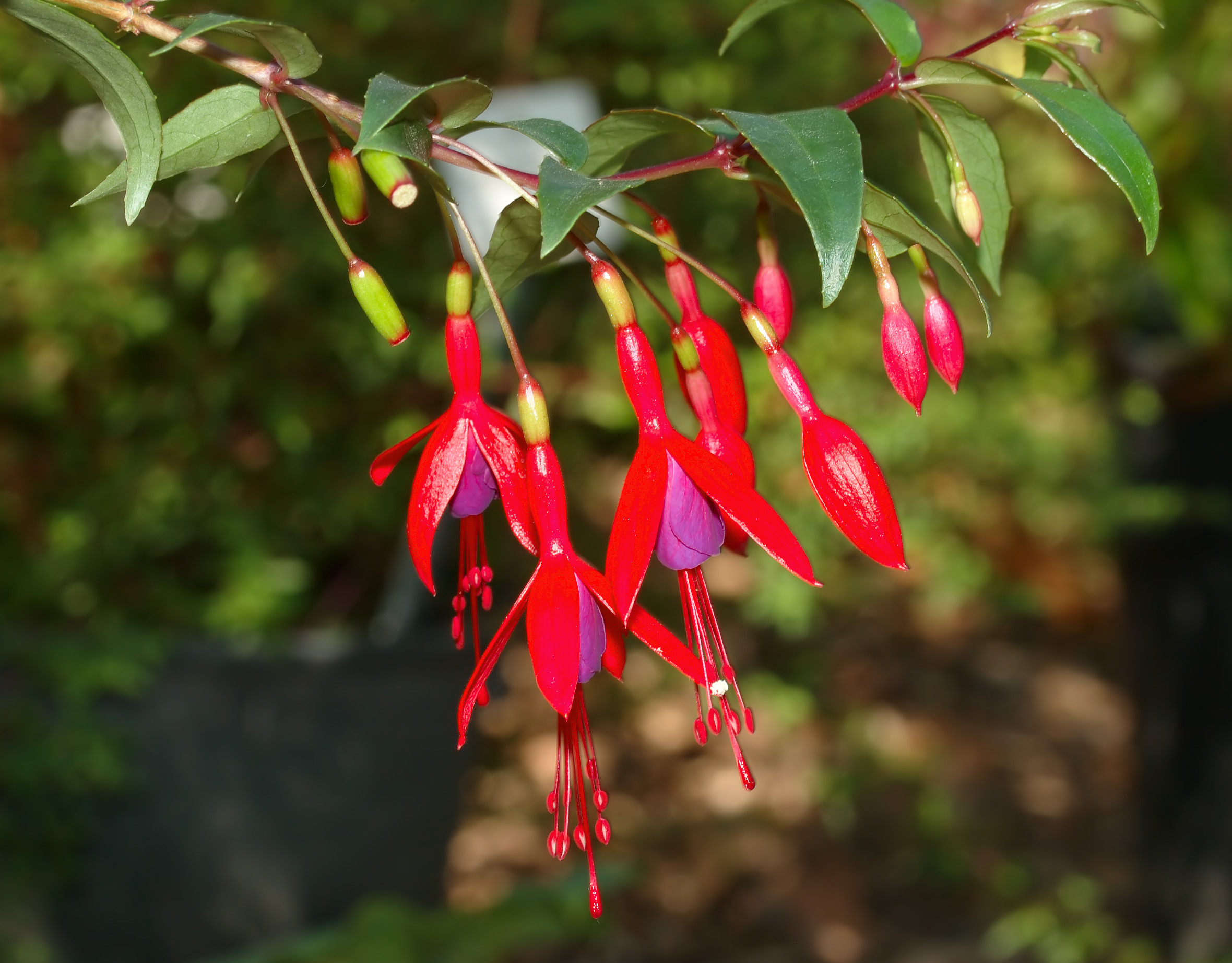
Fuchsia regia

Southern Argentina and Chile, and Southeastern Brazil. The nine species in this section have the nectary fused to the base of the tube, or hypanthium. The hypanthium is cylindrical and is generally no longer than the sepals. The stamens are long and are exserted beyond the corolla.

- Fuchsia alpestris
- Fuchsia bracelinae
- Fuchsia brevilobis
- Fuchsia campos-portoi
- Fuchsia coccinea
- Fuchsia glazioviana
- Fuchsia hatschbachii
- Fuchsia magellanica
- Fuchsia regia
  - Fuchsia regia subsp. regia
  - Fuchsia regia subsp. reitzii
  - Fuchsia regia subsp. serrae

=== Section Schufia ===
Mexico to Panama. These two species bear flowers in an erect, corymb-like panicle.

- Fuchsia arborescens
- Fuchsia paniculata
  - Fuchsia paniculata subsp. mixensis
  - Fuchsia paniculata subsp. paniculata

The name Schufia is a taxonomic anagram derived from Fuchsia.

=== Section Skinnera ===
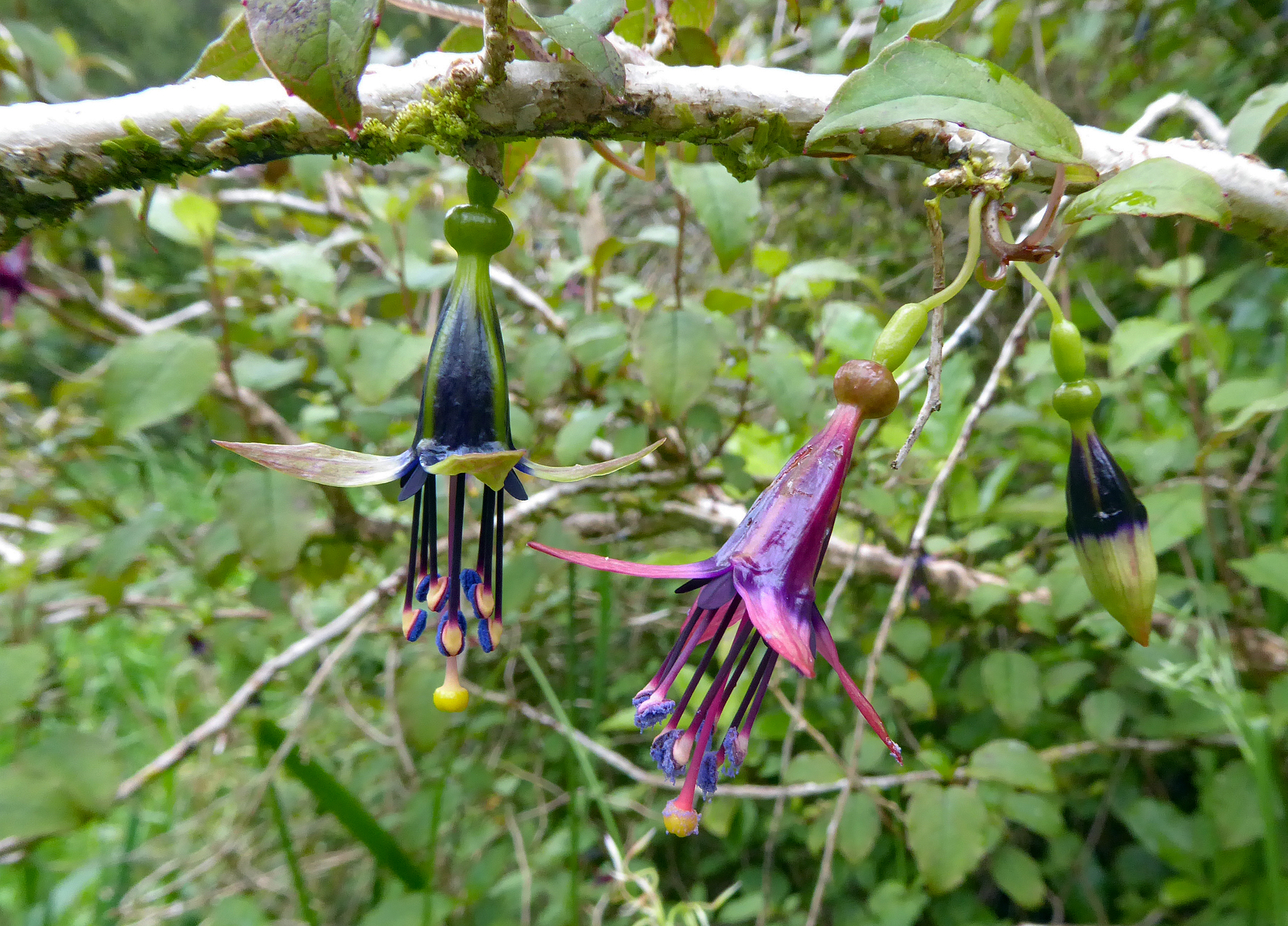
Fuchsia perscandens

New Zealand and Tahiti. The three living species have a floral tube with a swelling above the ovary. The sepals curve back on themselves and the petals are small or nearly absent. A new fossil species from the Early Miocene in New Zealand was described in October 2013.

- †Fuchsia antiqua
- Fuchsia cyrtandroides
- Fuchsia excorticata
- Fuchsia perscandens
- Fuchsia × colensoi – a natural hybrid

=== Section Verrucosa ===
Venezuela and Colombia.

- Fuchsia verrucosa

== Cultivation ==
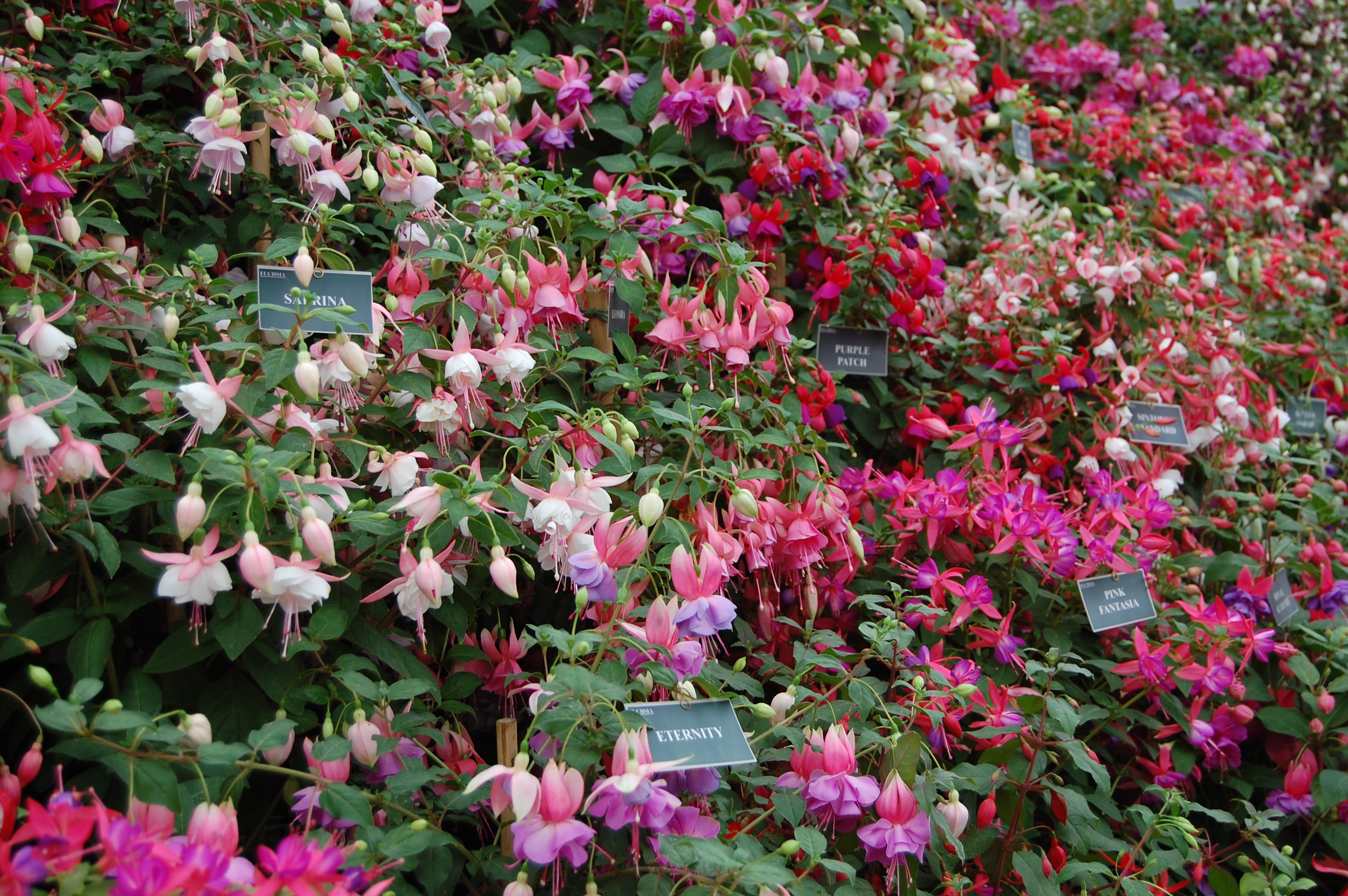
Selection of cultivated fuchsias at BBC Gardeners' World in 2011

Fuchsias are popular garden shrubs, and once planted can live for years with a minimal amount of care. The British Fuchsia Society maintains a list of hardy fuchsias that have been proven to survive a number of winters throughout Britain and to be back in flower each year by July. Enthusiasts report that hundreds and even thousands of hybrids survive and prosper throughout Britain. In the United States, the Northwest Fuchsia Society maintains an extensive list of fuchsias that have proven hardy in members' gardens in the Pacific Northwest over at least three winters.

Fuchsias from sections Quelusia (F. magellanica, F. regia), Encliandra, Skinnera (F. excorticata, F. perscandens) and Procumbentes (F. procumbens) have especially proven to be hardy in widespread areas of Britain and Ireland, as well as in many other countries such as New Zealand (aside from its native species) or the Pacific Northwest region of the United States and Canada. A number of species will easily survive outdoors in agreeable mild temperate areas. Though some may not always flower in the average British summer, they will often perform well in other favorable climatic zones. Even in somewhat colder regions, a number of the hardier species will often survive as herbaceous perennials, dying back and reshooting from below ground in the spring.

Due to the favorably mild, temperate climate created by the North Atlantic Current fuchsias grow abundantly in the West Kerry and West Cork region of Ireland and in the Isles of Scilly, even colonising wild areas there. While F. magellanica is not widespread in Scotland it has been known to grow wild in sheltered areas, such as the banks of local streams in Fife. In the Pacific Northwest region of the United States, F. magellanica also easily survives regional winters.

=== Categories ===
Horticultural fuchsias may be categorised as upright and bushy, or trailing. Some can be trained as hedges, such as F. magellanica. Faster-growing varieties are easiest to train. Care should be taken to choose the hardier cultivars for permanent plantings in the garden as many popular upright Fuchsias such as 'Ernie', 'Jollies Nantes' and 'Maria Landy' are not reliably winter hardy, but rather extremely tender (hardiness zone 10).

== Cultivars ==
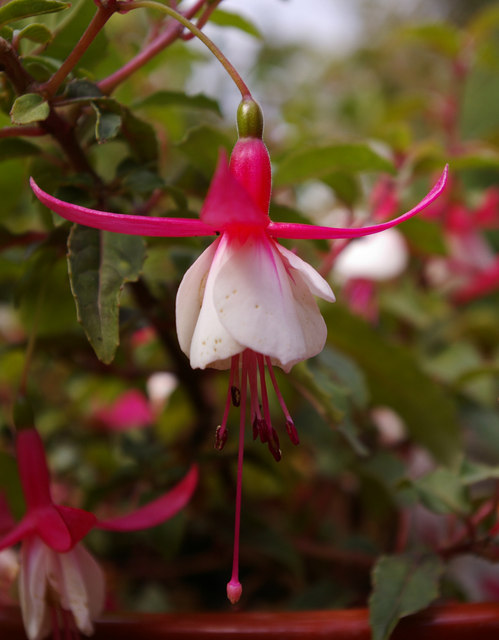
'Alice Hoffman'

In the UK, 60 cultivated varieties of fuchsia have gained the Royal Horticultural Society's Award of Garden Merit, including:-

- 'Alice Hoffman' (pink sepals, white petals – hardy)
- 'Display' (deep pink/rose pink single)
- 'Dollar Prinzessin' (cerise sepals, purple petals – hardy)
- 'Garden News' (light pink sepals, double magenta petals – hardy)
- 'Genii' (single, cerise/purple)
- 'Hawkshead' (white self)
- 'Lady Thumb' (compact, pink sepals, white petals)
- 'Mrs Popple' (vigorous, red sepals, purple petals – hardy)
- 'Riccartonii' (crimson sepals, purple petals)
- 'Snowcap' (scarlet sepals, white double petals)
- 'Swingtime' (double, scarlet sepals, white petals)
- 'Thalia' (tryphilla group, orange)
- 'Tom Thumb' (compact, pink sepals, mauve petals)

== Pests and diseases ==
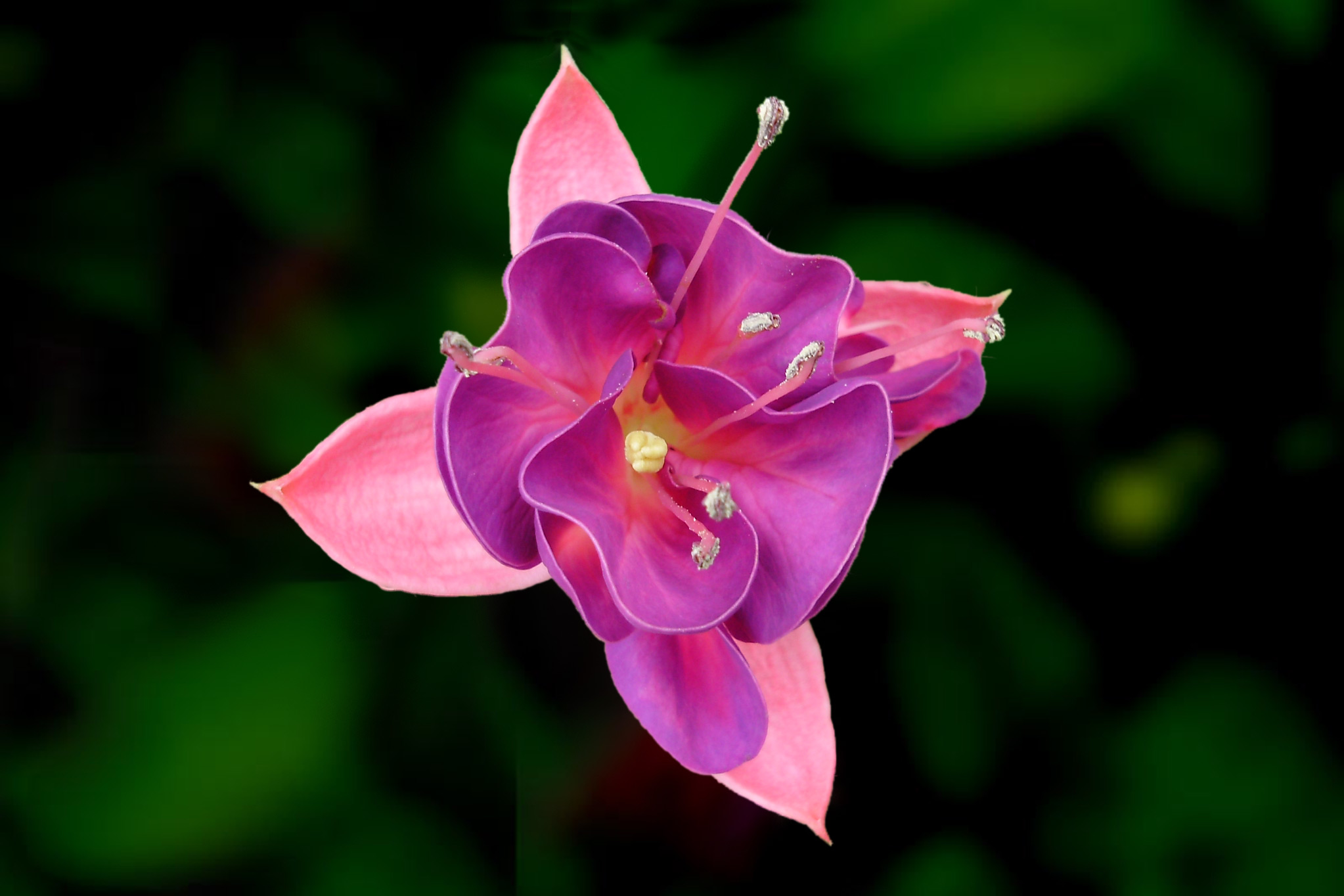
Fuchsia with blossom opened

Fuchsias are eaten by the caterpillars of some Lepidoptera, such as the elephant hawk-moth (Deilephila elpenor) and the black-lyre leafroller moth ("Cnephasia" jactatana). Other major insect pests include aphids, mirid bugs such as Lygocoris, Lygus and Plesiocoris spp., vine weevils (Otiorhynchus spp.), and greenhouse whitefly (Trialeurodes vaporariorum). Problematic mites include the fuchsia gall mite (Aculops fuchsiae) and red spider mite (Tetranychus urticae).

== Pronunciation and spelling ==
While the original pronunciation from the word's German origin is [ˈfʊksi̯ə], the standard pronunciation for the common name in English is /ˈfjuːʃə/ FEW-shə. As a consequence, fuchsia is often misspelled as fuschia in English.

When pronounced as scientific Latin name, the pronunciation would be /ˈfʊksiə/ FUUK-see-ə, if one applies the rule that the root word in honorific Latin names should follow as much as possible the original pronunciation of the name of the person the plant is named for, plus the standard pronunciation of the Latin suffix. In practice, however, English-speaking botanists often pronounce it the same as the common name.

== History ==
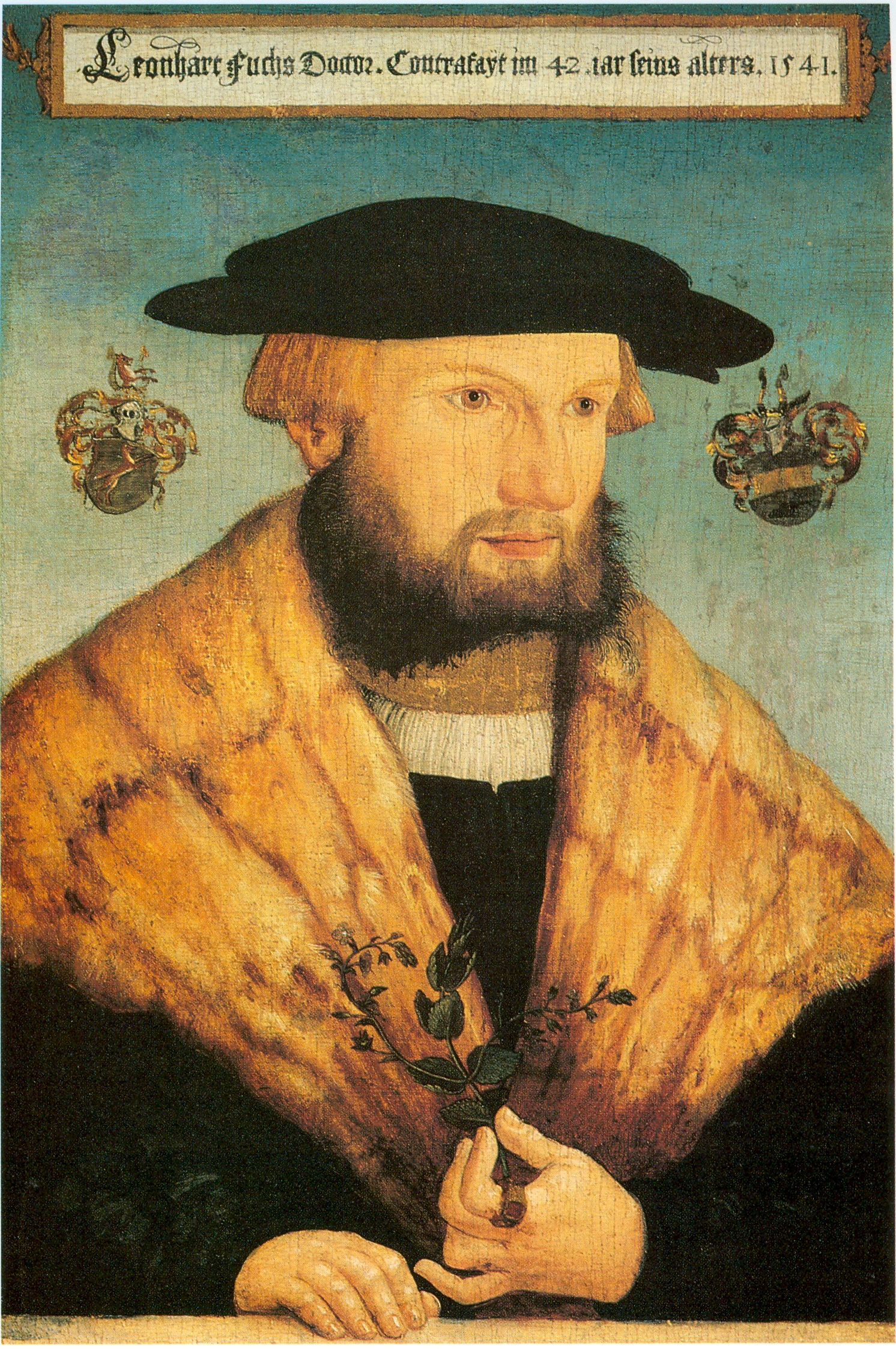
Leonhart Fuchs (1501–1566)

Leonhart Fuchs, the eminent namesake of the genus, was born in 1501 in Wemding in the Duchy of Bavaria. A physician and professor, he occupied the chair of Medicine at the University of Tübingen from his appointment at the age of 34 until his death in 1566. Besides his medical knowledge, according to his record of activities which was extensive for the time, he studied plants. This was usual for the period. Most remedies and medicines were herbal and the two subjects were often inseparable. In the course of his career Fuchs wrote the seminal De Historia Stirpium Commentarii Insignes, which was richly illustrated and published in 1542. Along with Otto Brunfels and Hieronymus Bock, he is today considered one of the three fathers of botany.

It was in honour of Fuchs' and his work that the fuchsia received its name shortly before 1703 by Charles Plumier. Plumier compiled his Nova Plantarum Americanum, which was published in Paris in 1703, based on the results of his third plant-finding trip to the Caribbean in search of new genera. In it he described Fuchsia triphylla flore coccinea.... Plumier's novel species was accepted by Linnaeus in 1753 but the long descriptive name was shortened in accordance with his binomial system.

The first fuchsia species were introduced into English gardens and glasshouses at the end of the 18th century. Fuchsia coccinea Aiton arrived at Kew Gardens in 1788 to be formally described in 1789. It was apparently shortly followed by Fuchsia magellanica Lam. There is much early confusion between these two similar-looking species in the Quelusia Section and they seem to have hybridized readily as well. Fuchsia magellanica, however, proved very hardy outdoors and its cultivars soon naturalized in favorable areas of the British Isles. Other species were quickly introduced to greenhouses. Of special interest is the introduction of Fuchsia fulgens Moç. & Sessé ex DC in the 1830s as it resulted in an outpouring of new cultivars when crossed with the existing species.

Philip Munz, in his A Revision of the Genus Fuchsia (1943), repeats the story that the fuchsia was first introduced into England by a sailor who grew it in a window where it was observed by a nurseryman from Hammersmith, a Mr. Lee, who succeeded in buying it and propagating it for the trade. This was supposedly either one of the short-tubed species such as Fuchsia magellanica or Fuchsia coccinea. The story given by Munz first appears in the 1850s and is embellished in various early publications. Captain Firth, a sailor, brought the plant back to England from one of his trips to his home in Hammersmith where he gave it to his wife. Later James Lee of St. Johns Wood, nurseryman and an astute businessman, heard of the plant and purchased it for £80. He then propagated as many as possible and sold them to the trade for prices ranging from £10 to £20 each. In the Floricultural Cabinet, 1855, there is a report which varies slightly from the above. There it is stated that F. coccinea was given to Kew Garden in 1788 by Captain Firth and that Lee acquired it from Kew. Other than a citation at Kew itself that Fuchsia coccinea was indeed given to it by a Captain Firth, there is no firm evidence to support any of these introduction stories.

Throughout the nineteenth century, plant-collecting fever spread throughout Europe and the United States. Many species of numerous genera were introduced, some as living plants, others as seed. The following fuchsias were recorded in England at Kew: F. lycioides, 1796; F. arborescens, 1824; F. microphylla, 1827; F. fulgens, 1830; F. corymbiflora, 1840; and F. apetala, F. decussata, F. dependens and F. serratifolia in 1843 and 1844, the last four species attributable to Messrs. Veitch of Exeter.

With the increasing numbers of differing species in England plant breeders began to immediately develop hybrids to develop more desirable garden plants. The first recorded experiments date to 1825 as F. arborescens Χ F. macrostemma and F. arborescens X F. coccinea where the quality of the resultant plants was unrecorded.

Between 1835 and 1850 there was a tremendous influx to England of both hybrids and varieties, the majority of which have been lost.

In 1848 Felix Porcher published the second edition of his book Le Fuchsia son Histoire et sa Culture. This described 520 cultivars. In 1871 in later editions of M. Porchers book reference is made to James Lye who was to become famous as a breeder of fuchsias in England. In 1883 the first book of English fuchsias was published.

Between 1900 and 1914 many of the famous cultivated varieties were produced which were grown extensively for Covent Garden market by many growers just outside London. During the period between the world wars, fuchsia-growing slowed as efforts were made toward crop production until after 1949, when plant and hybrid production resumed on a large scale.

In the United States, Sidney Mitchell, a member of the newly formed American Fuchsia Society in San Francisco (1929), shipped a large collection of fuchsias back to California from a nine-month trip to visit gardens in Europe in 1930. Almost immediately after the Society had been established in 1929, a thorough census and collection of fuchsias already growing in California gardens and nurseries had been undertaken under the scientific leadership and direction of Alice Eastwood. The census yielded ninety-one existing cultivars. Armed with that list, Mitchell acquired 51 new fuchsias; 48 of his plants survived the long trip. These were doled out to members of the society and local businesses. Half were also cultivated at the University of California Botanical Garden in Berkeley and the other half at the Berkeley Horticultural Nursery. A wave of interest in fuchsia breeding was launched. Together with the hybrids already in California, many famous American hybrids of the 1940s and 1950s are the descendants of this 1930 group.
