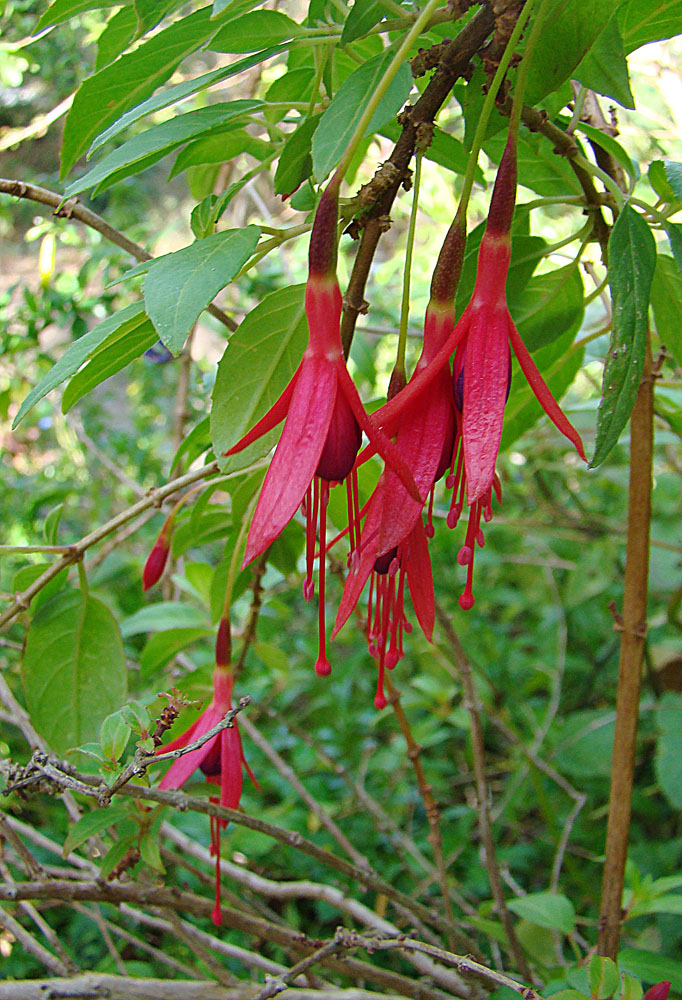
- In bloom

Scientific classification
- Kingdom: Plantae
- Clade: Embryophytes
- Clade: Tracheophytes
- Clade: Spermatophytes
- Clade: Angiosperms
- Clade: Eudicots
- Clade: Rosids
- Order: Myrtales
- Family: Onagraceae
- Genus: Fuchsia
- Species: F. hatschbachii

Binomial name
- Fuchsia hatschbachii P.E.Berry

= Fuchsia hatschbachii =

Species of flowering plant

Fuchsia hatschbachii, called Hatschbach's fuchsia, is a species of flowering plant in the genus Fuchsia, endemic to the state of Paraná in Brazil. It has gained the Royal Horticultural Society's Award of Garden Merit. The species is named after Gert Hatschbach, Director of the Museu Botânico de Curitiba who collects and studies flora of Paraná.

== Description ==
Fuchsia hatschbachii are erect to scandent shrubs, ranging 1–3 meters (3 ft 3 in – 9 ft 10 in) tall, or up to 5 meters (16 ft) when climbing on trees. Leaves are narrowly lance-ovate, 3.0–7.5(–11.0) x 0.8–2.5(–3.0) cm, acuminate at the tip and rounded at the base, dark green above and pale below, with small trichomes 0.8–1 mm in length at the bottom of the lower midvein on some plants. The margin is slightly gland-denticulate. Petioles are purple, (2–)3–6(–7) x 1–2 mm. Stipules are semideciduous, narrowly triangular, 1–1.7 x 0.6–1.2 mm. Plants bloom from November to March. with solitary flowers on 1-203 cm long pedicels. The ovary is cylindrical, 5–9 x 2.5–3 mm, and the hypanthium is cylindrical, red, and 10–15 x 3–5 mm. Sepals are 18–26 mm long, and petals are violet, broadly obovate, 12–17 x 8–12 mm. Fruit are purple, subcylindrical quadrangled, 13–18 x 7–10 mm.

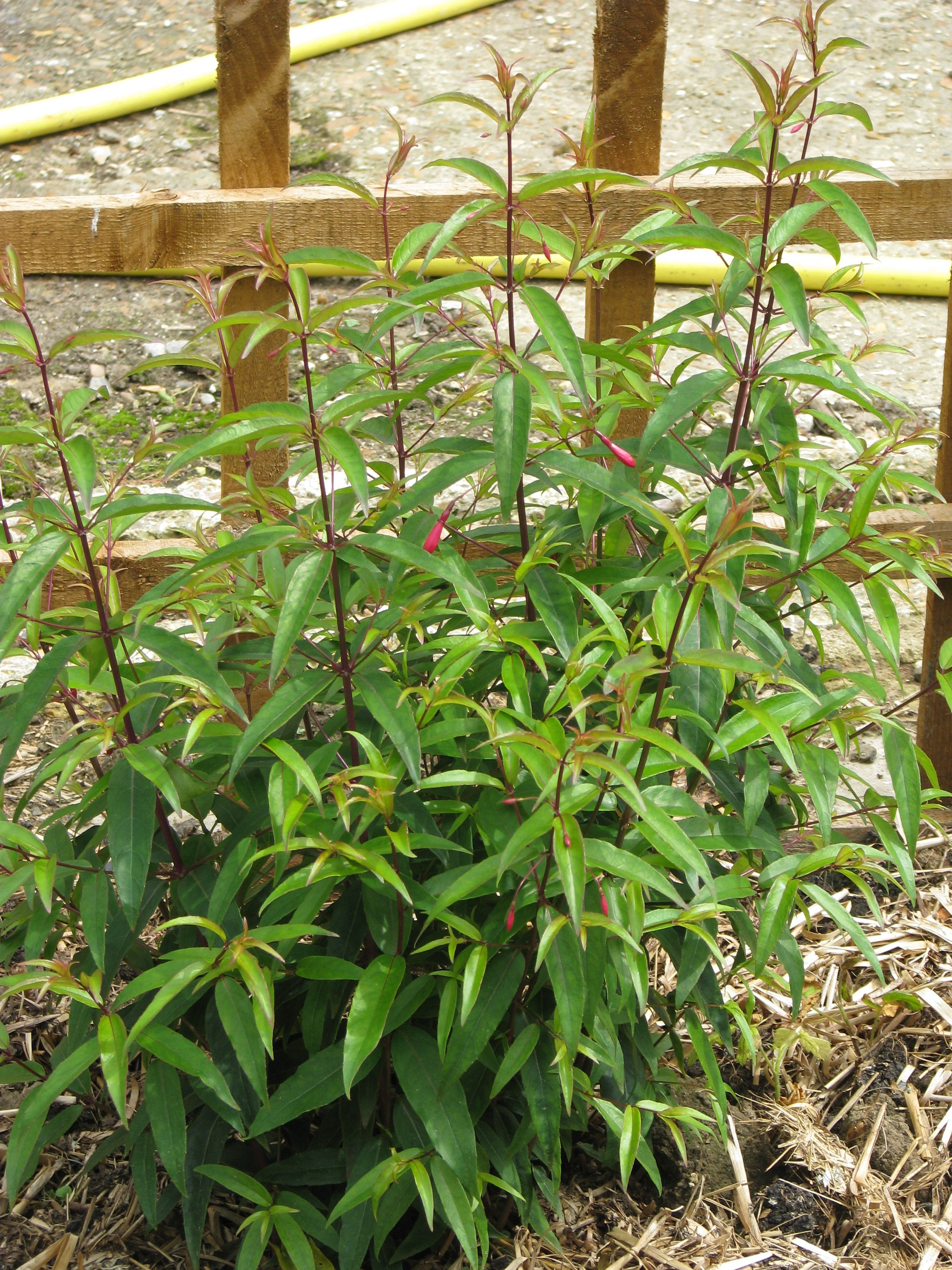

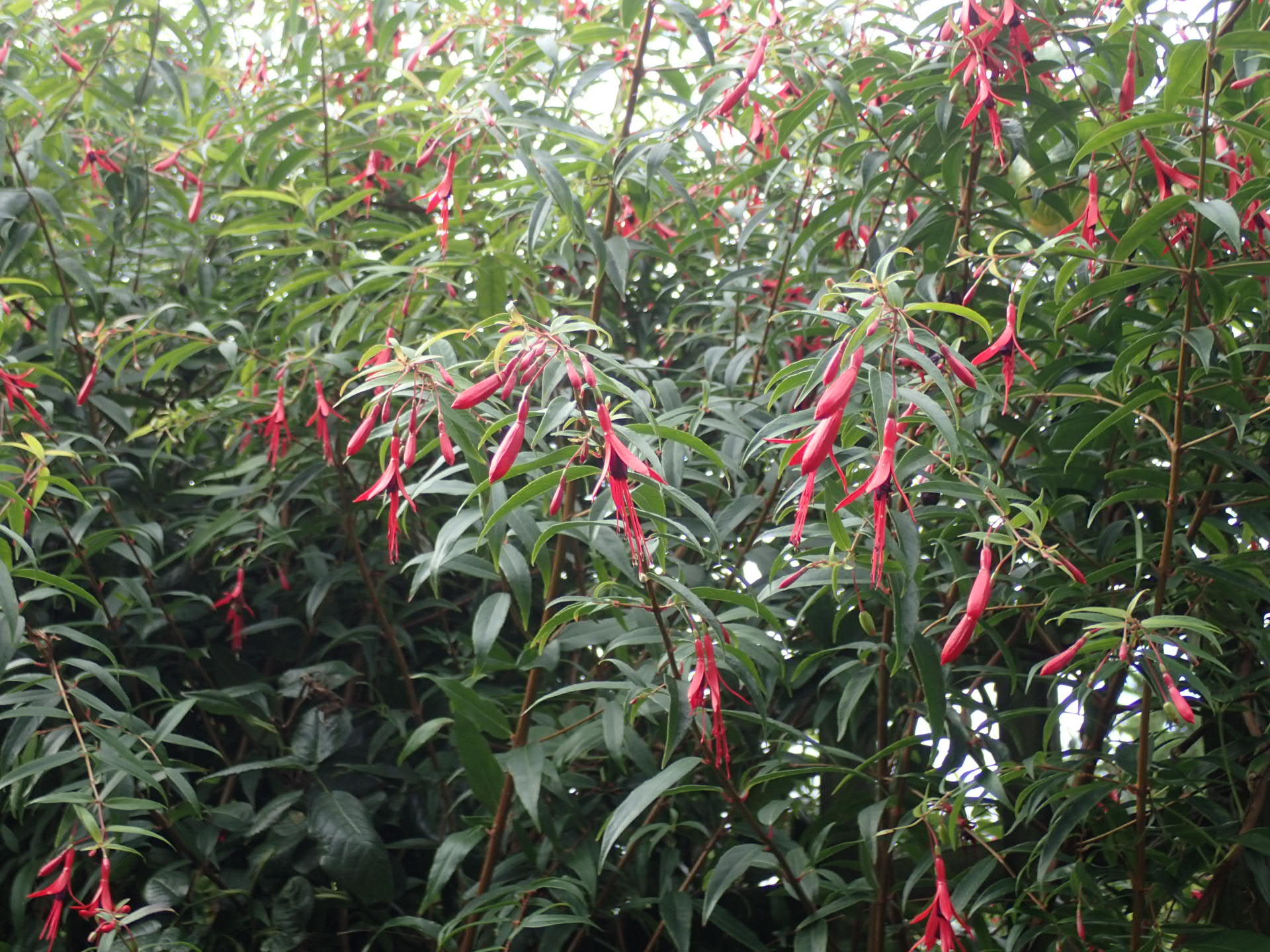

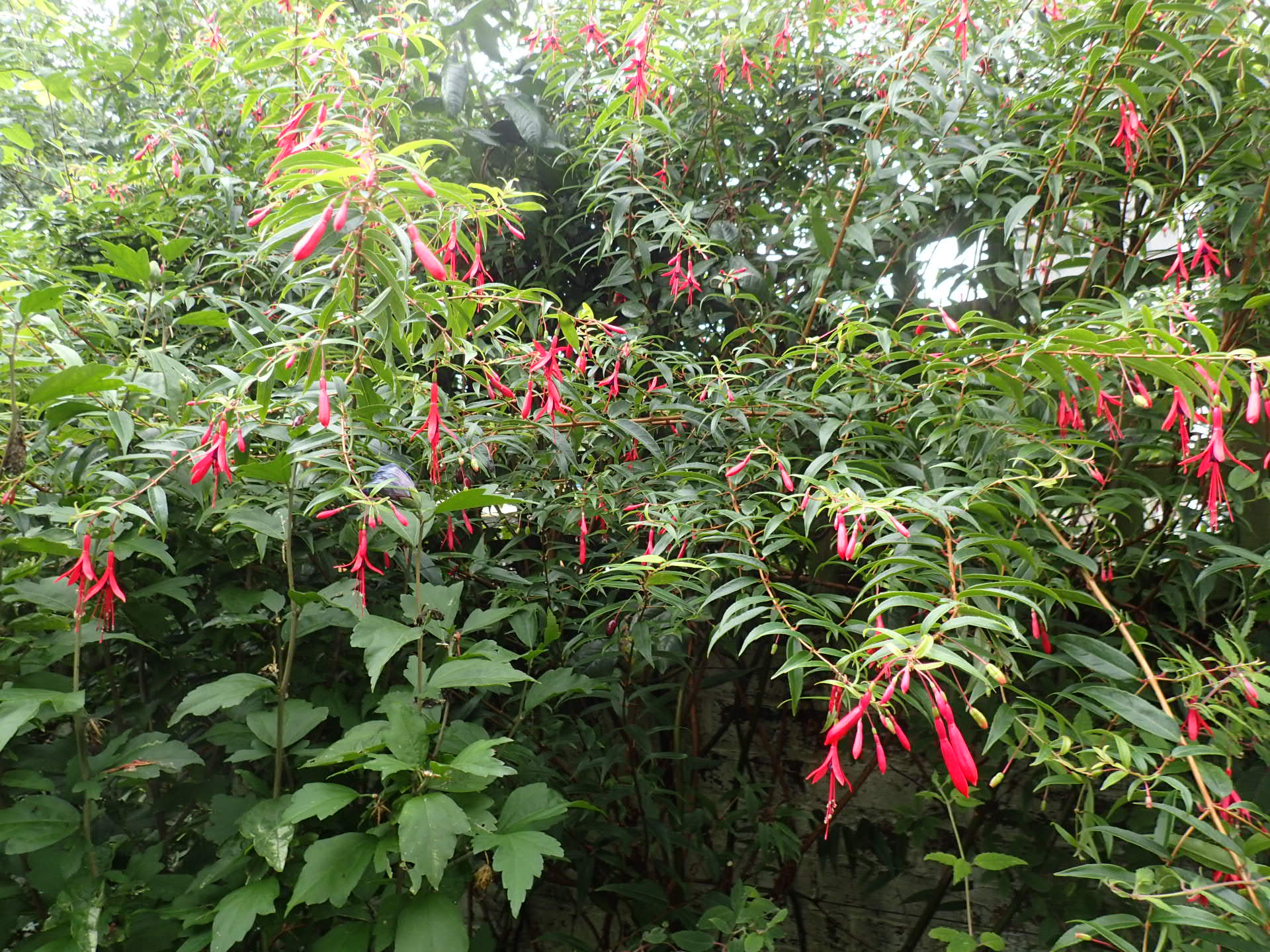

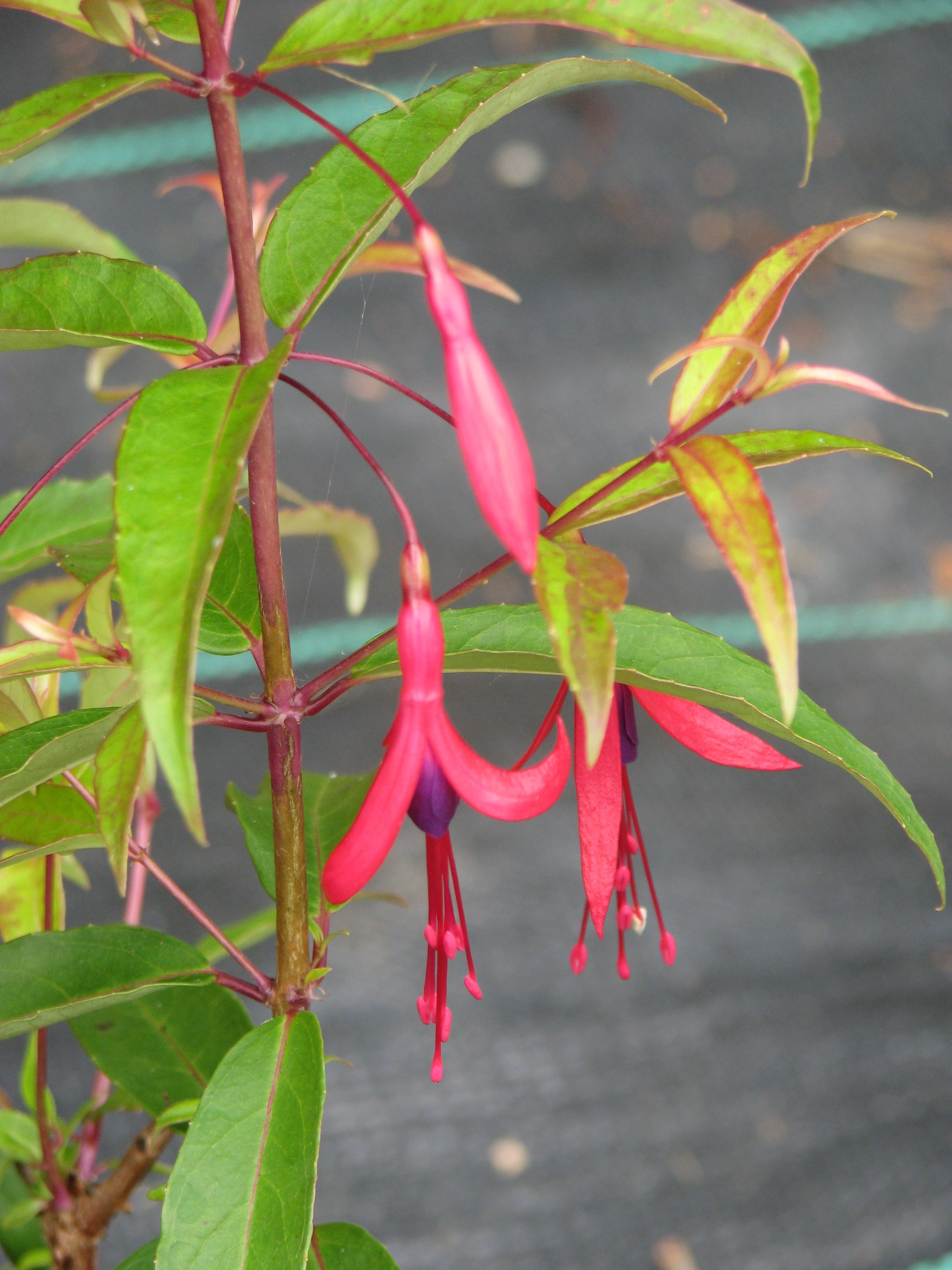

== Distribution ==
Fuchsia hatschbachii is found in low forests located on sandstone or limestone outcrops, within the Brazilian Highlands north and west of Curitiba in Paraná, Brazil, at elevations between 950 and 1,150 meters (3,120 and 3,770 ft).
