= Fuchsia summa =

Conservation status
- Vulnerable (IUCN 3.1)

Scientific classification
- Kingdom: Plantae
- Clade: Tracheophytes
- Clade: Angiosperms
- Clade: Eudicots
- Clade: Rosids
- Order: Myrtales
- Family: Onagraceae
- Genus: Fuchsia
- Species: F. summa

Binomial name
- Fuchsia summa P.E.Berry

Species of flowering plant

Fuchsia summa is a species of plant in the family Onagraceae. It is endemic to Ecuador: Loja. Found on the road from Yangana to Cerro Toledo in open patches above the tree line at elevations from 3,100 to 3,450 meters. It forms a low shrub to one half meter tall. The dark-green, subcoriaceous leaves are densely packed along the stems. The tube and sepals are four-angled. The sepals are slightly shorter than the petals and have green tips.
