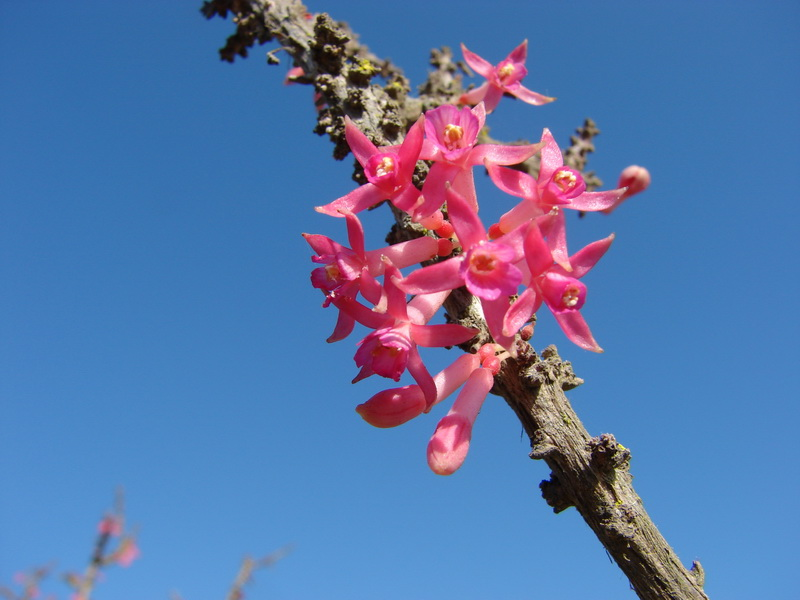

Scientific classification
- Kingdom: Plantae
- Clade: Tracheophytes
- Clade: Angiosperms
- Clade: Eudicots
- Clade: Rosids
- Order: Myrtales
- Family: Onagraceae
- Genus: Fuchsia
- Species: F. lycioides

Binomial name
- Fuchsia lycioides Andrews, 1800

Synonyms
- Fuchsia rosea Ruiz & Pav., 1802

= Fuchsia lycioides =

Species of flowering plant

Fuchsia lycioides or the Box-thorn Fuchsia is a species of Fuchsia found in Chile at elevations of 0 – 100 meters It is the only species in Section Kierschlegeria

== Description ==
It is a deciduous shrub about 2 to 3 meters high, with woody branches.

Fuchsia lycioides flowers are rose-colored and dimorphic, with four sepals and four small petals. The female flowers have a cylindrical floral tube that is typically 1.5-3 mm long, with a 6-10 mm style. They also have eight reduced anthers without pollen. Hermaphrodite flowers are larger, 2.5-5 mm long, with style lengths ranging from 14-22 mm. Although the tube lengths of the two flower types may occasionally overlap, there is a clear gap of 3.5-4 mm between the maximum style length of small female flowers and the minimum style length of larger hermaphrodite flowers.
