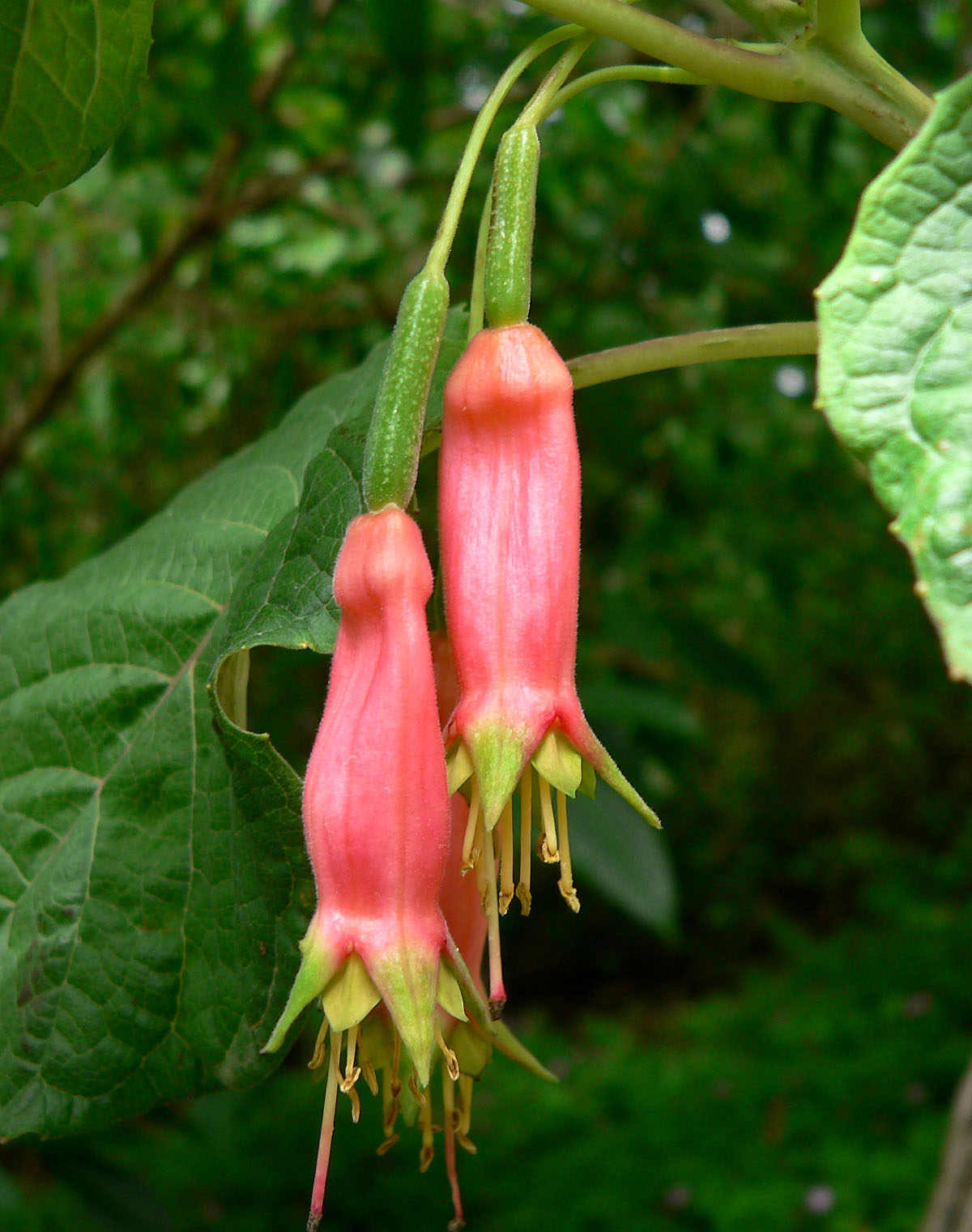

Scientific classification
- Kingdom: Plantae
- Clade: Tracheophytes
- Clade: Angiosperms
- Clade: Eudicots
- Clade: Rosids
- Order: Myrtales
- Family: Onagraceae
- Genus: Fuchsia
- Species: F. splendens

Binomial name
- Fuchsia splendens Zucc.

Synonyms
- Fuchsia cordifolia Benth.; Fuchsia intermedia Hemsl.

= Fuchsia splendens =

Species of flowering plant

Fuchsia splendens is a plant of the genus Fuchsia native to Central America.F. splendens is variable in tube color and length across it range. There are no taxa currently recognized below the rank of species. While often encountered in written works and on the internet, names such as Fuchsia splendens var. cordifolia are not valid.

== Distribution ==
Mexico to Costa Rica.

== Description ==
Shrubs that reach 0.5-2.5 meters in height, terrestrial or occasionally epiphytic. Leaves 3.5-13 × 0.8–4 cm, opposite or rarely ternate, ovate to chordate, base rounded to chordate, apex acute to acuminate; Petiole 1.2–8 cm. Bisexual flowers, axillary, pendulous armpits in the distal armpits; Pedicels 35–75 mm; Ovary narrowly cylindrical; Floral tube 20-64 × 4–9 mm, cylindrical, laterally compressed in the base around the nectar; Sepals 8-20 × 5–8 mm, lanceolate; Tube and sepals pink to red; Petals 6-12 × 4–8 mm, green with reddish base, ovate, subacuminate apex; Filaments 10–20 mm and 6–14 mm, greenish. Berries 20-40 × 5–8 mm, elongated, green with purplish speckles when ripe. It has a chromosome number of 2n = 22

== Etymology ==
Fuchsia is named for Leonhart Fuchs [1501-66], a renaissance physician, botanist and professor at the University of Tübingen. Splendens can be taken to variously mean shining, gleaming, glistening, glittering, bright, or brilliant.
