= Fuchsia steyermarkii =

Conservation status
- Vulnerable (IUCN 3.1)

Scientific classification
- Kingdom: Plantae
- Clade: Tracheophytes
- Clade: Angiosperms
- Clade: Eudicots
- Clade: Rosids
- Order: Myrtales
- Family: Onagraceae
- Genus: Fuchsia
- Species: F. steyermarkii

Binomial name
- Fuchsia steyermarkii P.E.Berry

Species of flowering plant

Fuchsia steyermarkii is a species of plant in the family Onagraceae. It is endemic to Ecuador.
