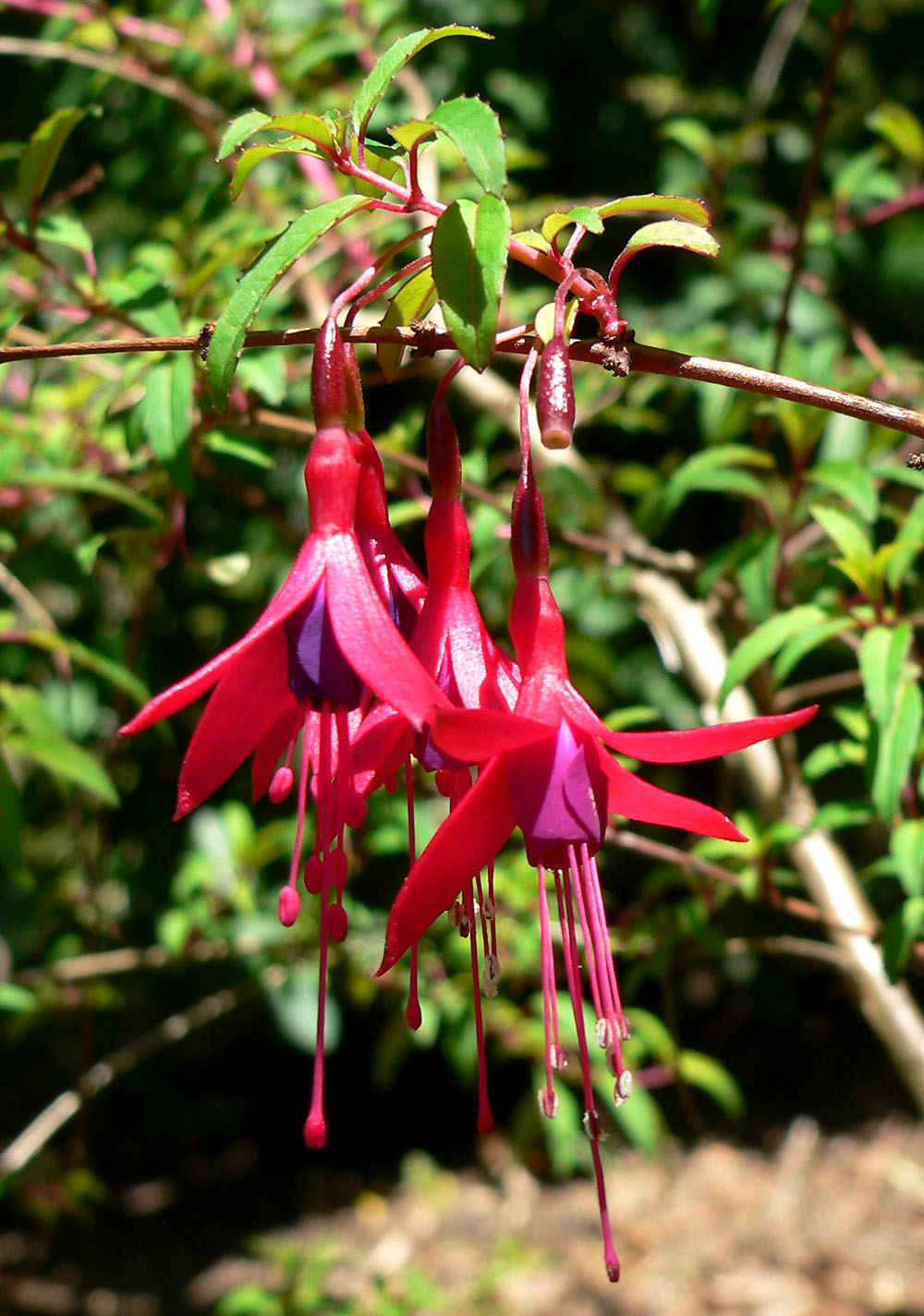

Scientific classification
- Kingdom: Plantae
- Clade: Tracheophytes
- Clade: Angiosperms
- Clade: Eudicots
- Clade: Rosids
- Order: Myrtales
- Family: Onagraceae
- Genus: Fuchsia
- Species: F. campos-portoi

Binomial name
- Fuchsia campos-portoi Pilger & Schulze 1935

= Fuchsia campos-portoi =

Species of flowering plant

Fuchsia campos-portoi is a plant of the genus Fuchsia native to Brazil.

== Description ==
Fuchsia campos-portoi are small shrubs around 0.3-2 meters tall. The leaves are mostly arranged in threes and is narrowly lanceolate, 12-40 x 2-6(-8) mm. The berries are oblong, 14-16 x 7-8 mm thick and purple, and the seeds are 1.3-1.6 x 0.7-1.1 mm wide.

== Distribution ==
Fuchsia campos-portoi is native to the campos rupestres habitat of the Itatiaia mountain massif, located on the border of Minas Gerais and Rio de Janeiro, Brazil, at elevations ranging from 2,100 to 2,550 meters found growing among rocks. Fuchsia campos-portoi is found in shrubby patches or open, rocky sites, often experiencing winter frosts. It typically grows alongside Fuchsia regia subsp. regia, where several intermediate hybrids between the two species have been discovered.
