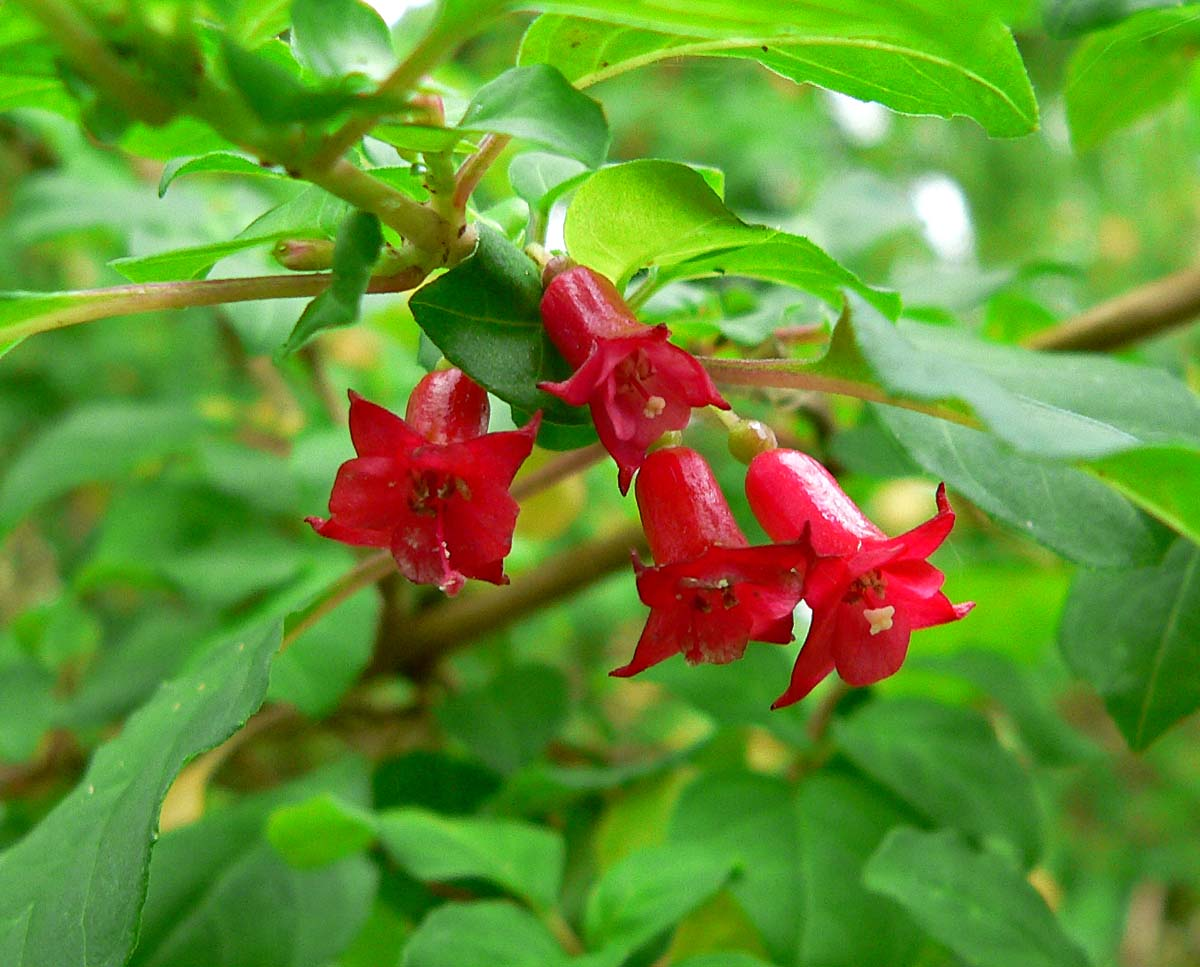

Scientific classification
- Kingdom: Plantae
- Clade: Tracheophytes
- Clade: Angiosperms
- Clade: Eudicots
- Clade: Rosids
- Order: Myrtales
- Family: Onagraceae
- Genus: Fuchsia
- Species: F. parviflora

Binomial name
- Fuchsia parviflora Lindl. 1827

Synonyms
- Fuchsia biflora Sessé & Moc. (1894; Fuchsia cylindracea Lindl. 1838; Fuchsia mexiae Munz 1943; Fuchsia michoacanensis Sessé & Moc. 1888; Fuchsia ovata Moc. & Sessé ex DC. 1828; Kierschlegeria lindleyi Spach 1835

= Fuchsia parviflora =

Species of plant

Fuchsia parviflora is a species of Fuchsia found in Mexico.
