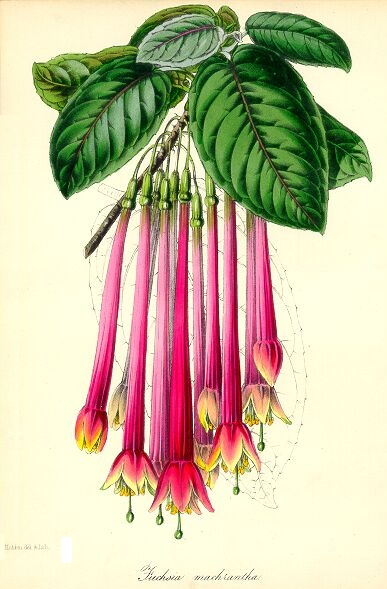

Scientific classification
- Kingdom: Plantae
- Clade: Tracheophytes
- Clade: Angiosperms
- Clade: Eudicots
- Clade: Rosids
- Order: Myrtales
- Family: Onagraceae
- Genus: Fuchsia
- Species: F. apetala

Binomial name
- Fuchsia apetala Ruiz & Pav.

Synonyms
- Fuchsia hirsuta Hemsl.; Fuchsia macrantha Hook.; Fuchsia unduavensis Munz

= Fuchsia apetala =

Species of plant

Fuchsia apetala is a species of small shrub or vine in the family Onagraceae. It is native to Bolivia and Peru.
