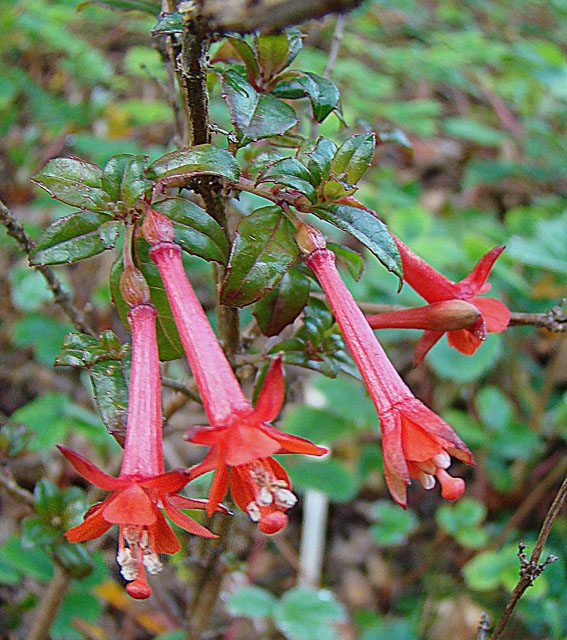

Conservation status
- Least Concern (IUCN 3.1)

Scientific classification
- Kingdom: Plantae
- Clade: Tracheophytes
- Clade: Angiosperms
- Clade: Eudicots
- Clade: Rosids
- Order: Myrtales
- Family: Onagraceae
- Genus: Fuchsia
- Species: F. loxensis

Binomial name
- Fuchsia loxensis Kunth

Synonyms
- Fuchsia apiculata I.M.Johnst. 1925; Fuchsia umbrosa Benth. 1845

= Fuchsia loxensis =

Species of flowering plant

Fuchsia loxensis is a species of fuchsia in the family Onagraceae. It is endemic to Ecuador.
