= Fuchsia sylvatica =

Conservation status
- Least Concern (IUCN 3.1)

Scientific classification
- Kingdom: Plantae
- Clade: Tracheophytes
- Clade: Angiosperms
- Clade: Eudicots
- Clade: Rosids
- Order: Myrtales
- Family: Onagraceae
- Genus: Fuchsia
- Species: F. sylvatica

Binomial name
- Fuchsia sylvatica Benth.

Species of flowering plant

Fuchsia sylvatica is a species of plant in the family Onagraceae. It is endemic to Ecuador.
