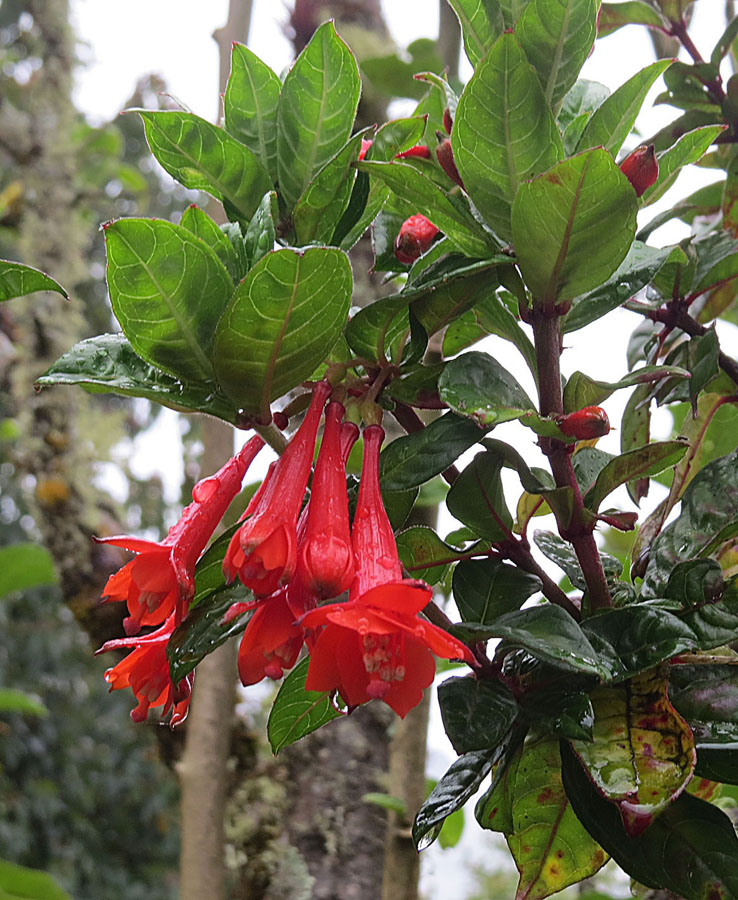
- Flowers
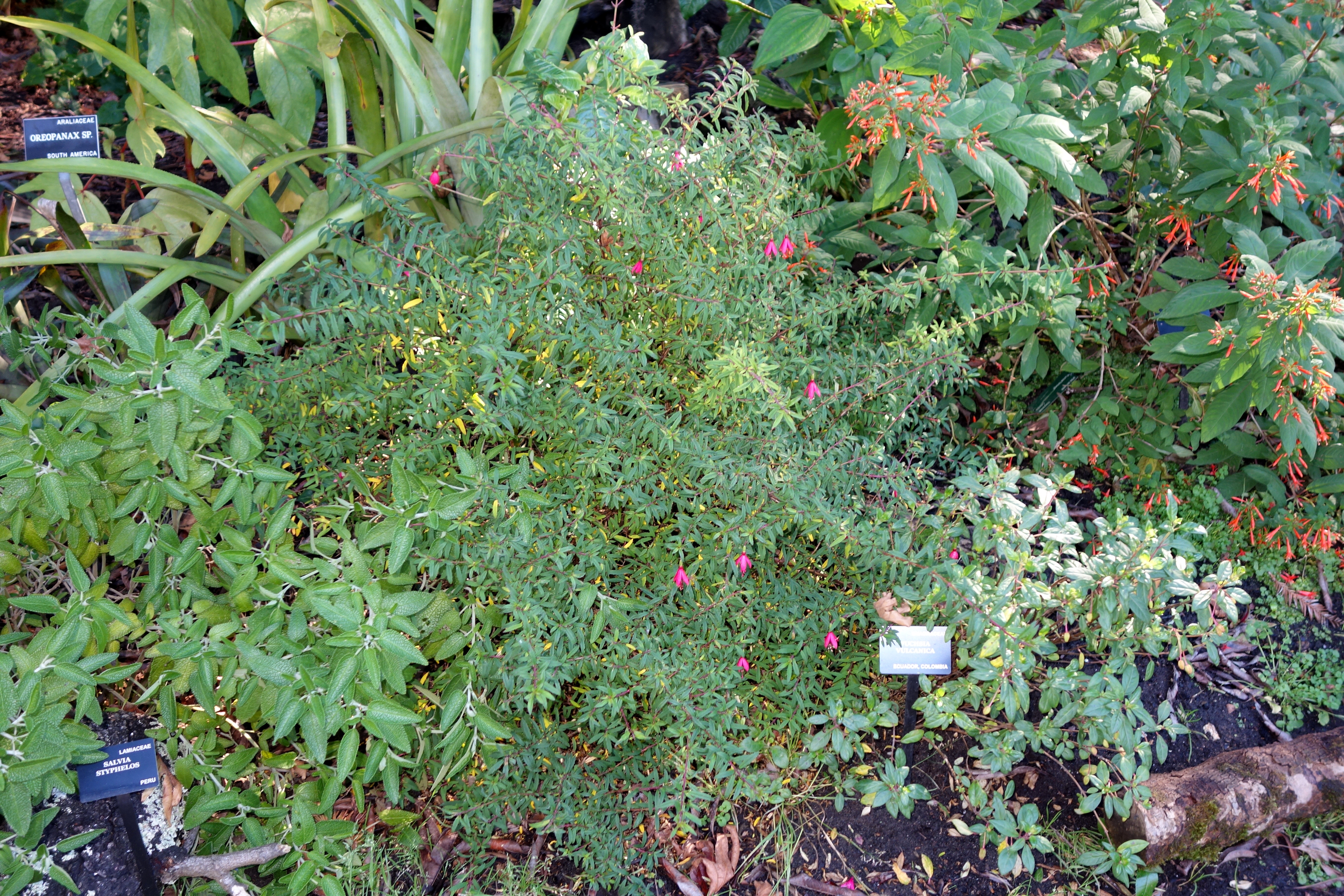
- At the San Francisco Botanical Garden

Scientific classification
- Kingdom: Plantae
- Clade: Tracheophytes
- Clade: Angiosperms
- Clade: Eudicots
- Clade: Rosids
- Order: Myrtales
- Family: Onagraceae
- Genus: Fuchsia
- Species: F. vulcanica

Binomial name
- Fuchsia vulcanica André

Synonyms
- Fuchsia hitchcockii I.M.Johnst.

= Fuchsia vulcanica =

Species of plant

Fuchsia vulcanica, the Azufral volcano fuchsia, is a species of flowering plant in the family Onagraceae. It is native to Colombia and Ecuador. A shrub reaching 3.5 m (11 ft), it can have pink, scarlet-red, or orange-red flowers. It has gained the Royal Horticultural Society's Award of Garden Merit as a conservatory or greenhouse plant.
