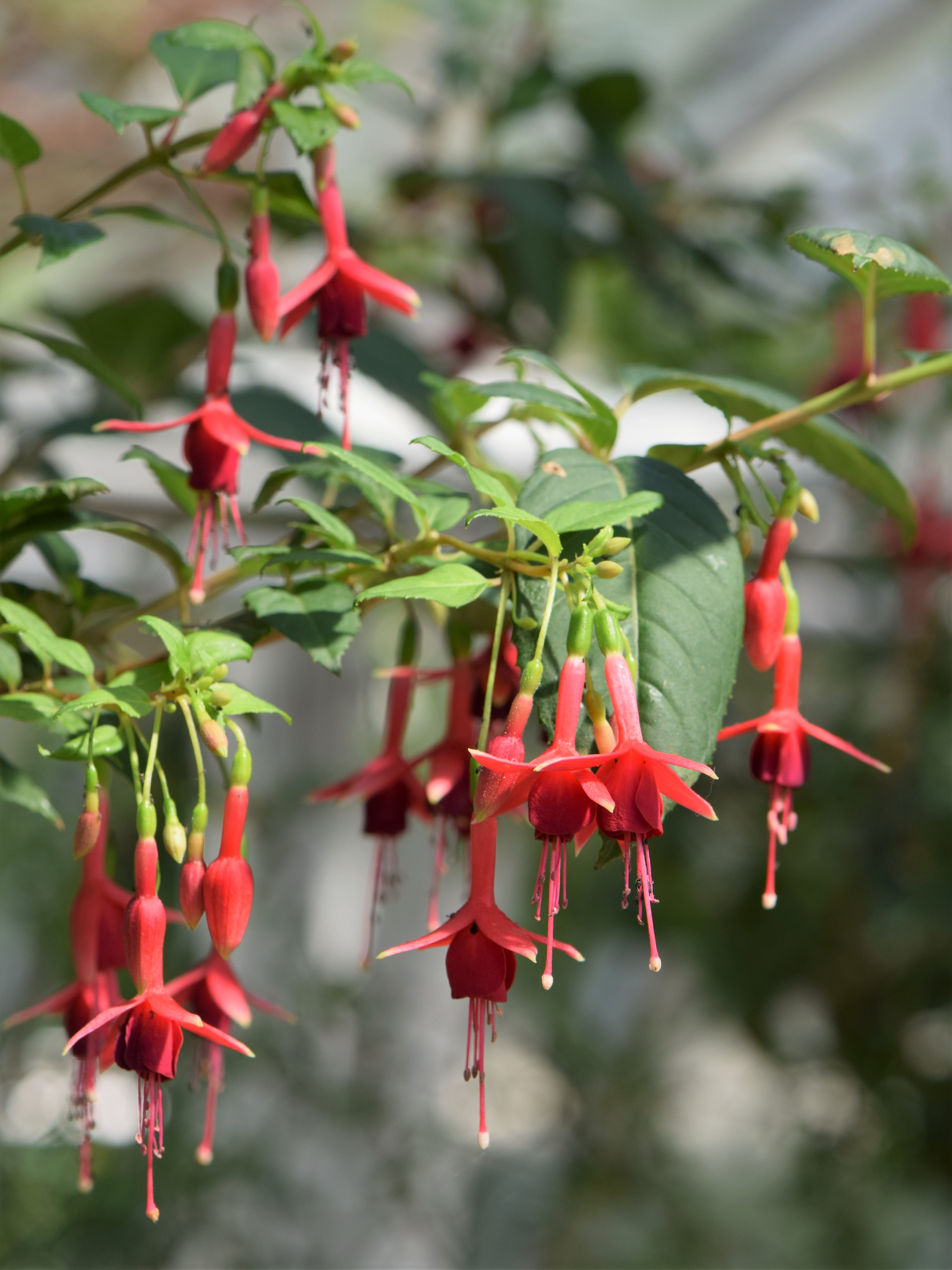

Scientific classification
- Kingdom: Plantae
- Clade: Tracheophytes
- Clade: Angiosperms
- Clade: Eudicots
- Clade: Rosids
- Order: Myrtales
- Family: Onagraceae
- Genus: Fuchsia
- Species: F. coccinea

Binomial name
- Fuchsia coccinea Aiton 1789

Synonyms
- Fuchsia elegans Salisb. 1791; Fuchsia montana Cambess. 1830; Fuchsia pendula Salisb. 1796; Fuchsia pendula terminalis J.Harrison 1841; Nahusia coccinea Schneev. 1793; Skinnera coccinea Moench 1802

= Fuchsia coccinea =

Species of plant

Fuchsia coccinea is a species of Fuchsia found in Brazil.
