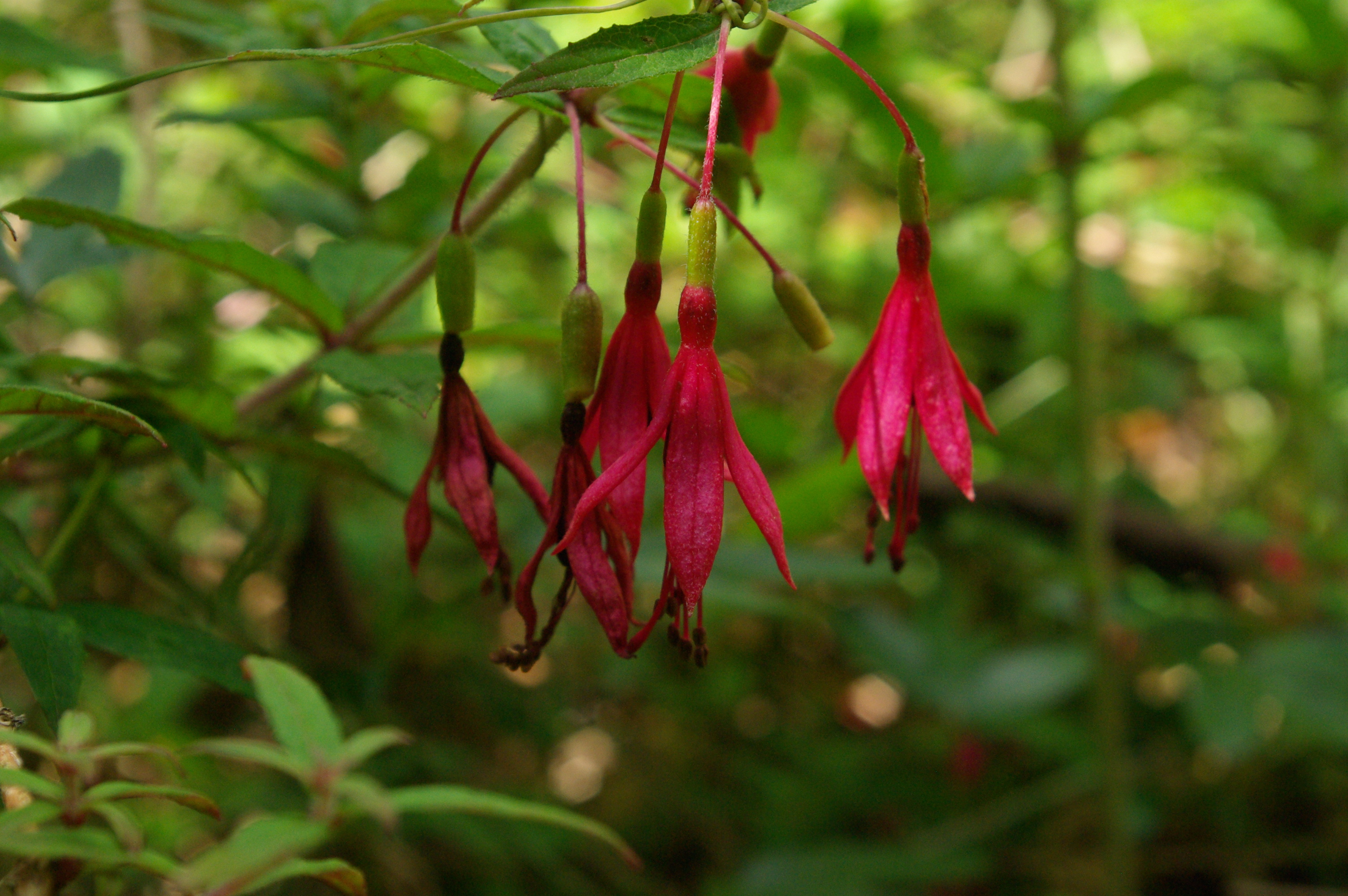

Scientific classification
- Kingdom: Plantae
- Clade: Tracheophytes
- Clade: Angiosperms
- Clade: Eudicots
- Clade: Rosids
- Order: Myrtales
- Family: Onagraceae
- Genus: Fuchsia
- Species: F. bracelinae

Binomial name
- Fuchsia bracelinae Munz 1943

= Fuchsia bracelinae =

Species of plant

Fuchsia bracelinae is a species of Fuchsia found in Brazil.

== Taxonomy ==
Fuchsia bracelinae was first described in the Proceedings of the California Academy of Sciences in 1943 by Philip A. Munz. The plant was named after botanist Nina Floy Bracelin.
