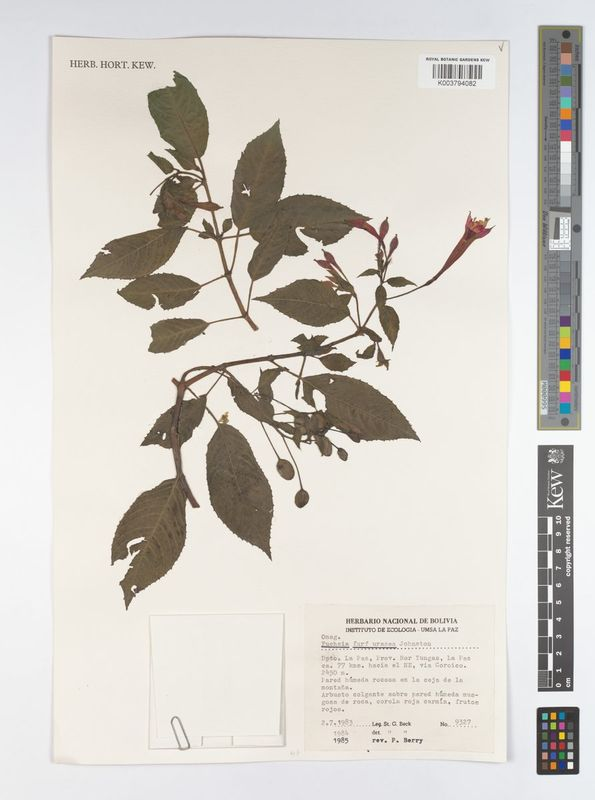

Scientific classification
- Kingdom: Plantae
- Clade: Embryophytes
- Clade: Tracheophytes
- Clade: Spermatophytes
- Clade: Angiosperms
- Clade: Eudicots
- Clade: Rosids
- Order: Myrtales
- Family: Onagraceae
- Genus: Fuchsia
- Species: F. furfuracea

Binomial name
- Fuchsia furfuracea I.M.Johnst.

= Fuchsia furfuracea =

Species of flowering plant

Fuchsia furfuracea is a species of flowering plant in the family Onagraceae. It is a scrambling shrub with elliptic-ovate leaves, and pendant pink to red flowers. The fruits are berries. The species is native to Bolivia, and was described in 1925.

== Taxonomy ==
Fuchsia furfuracea was described by Ivan Murray Johnston in 1925. It is part of the section Fuchsia, and forms part of a species group with Fuchsia tincta and Fuchsia vargasiana.

== Distribution ==
Fuchsia furfuracea is native to the subtropical biome of Bolivia. It grows mostly in La Paz and Cochabamba.

Fuchsia furfuracea mostly grows in the yungas bioregion. It grows in wet sites, such as on cliff overhangs and near streams in cloud forests, at elevations of 2,800–3,050 metres (9,190–10,010 ft). It occurs sympatrically with Fuchsia sanctae-rosae, and may hybridise with it.

== Description ==
Fuchsia furfuracea is a scrambling shrub. It grows 0.5–2.5 metres (1.6–8.2 ft) tall. The branchlets are green or reddish, and the older branches have smooth, purple to tan bark.

The leaves are elliptic-ovate, 6–15 centimetres (2.4–5.9 in) long, 3–6 centimetres (1.2–2.4 in) wide, and furfuraceous or covered in short hairs. The leaves are arranged oppositely, or rarely in clusters of three.The leaf stems are 2–5 centimetres (0.79–1.97 in) long.

The flowers are pendant, and 15–40 millimetres (0.59–1.57 in). The flowers are narrowly funnel-shaped, dull pink to lavender or orange red, 25–48 millimetres (0.98–1.89 in) long, and widen from 2–3 millimetres (0.079–0.118 in) at the base, to 6–9 millimetres (0.24–0.35 in) wide at the rim. The sepals are lanceolate, 10–18 millimetres (0.39–0.71 in) long, and 3–5 millimetres (0.12–0.20 in) wide. The sepals are light red, but become white at the tips. The petals are bright pink to dark red, elliptic-ovate, 6–10 millimetres (0.24–0.39 in) long, and 3–5 millimetres (0.12–0.20 in) wide.

The fruit is an ovoid to ellipsoid berry with short hairs, which is 12–16 millimetres (0.47–0.63 in) long, and 6–12 millimetres (0.24–0.47 in) thick. The seeds are around 1.5 millimetres (0.059 in) long, and 1 millimetre (0.039 in) wide.

Fuchsia furfuracea resembles Fuchsia corymbiflora, but has longer flower stems, and short soft hairs inside the hypanthium.
