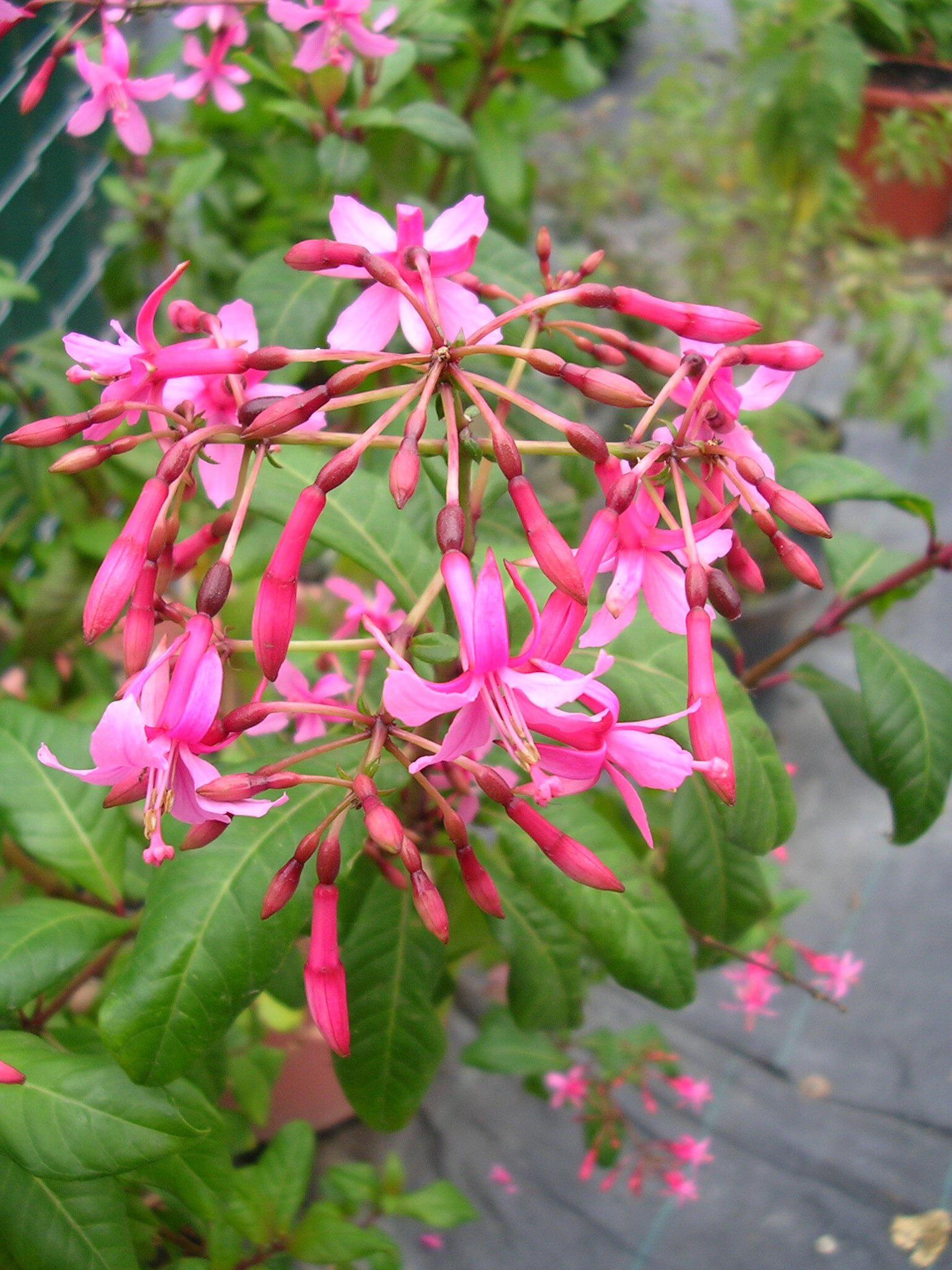

Scientific classification
- Kingdom: Plantae
- Clade: Tracheophytes
- Clade: Angiosperms
- Clade: Eudicots
- Clade: Rosids
- Order: Myrtales
- Family: Onagraceae
- Genus: Fuchsia
- Species: F. arborescens

Binomial name
- Fuchsia arborescens Sims

= Fuchsia arborescens =

Species of flowering plant

Fuchsia arborescens, commonly known as the tree fuchsia, is a tree of the genus Fuchsia native to Central America. It belongs to the section Schufia and is most closely related to Fuchsia paniculata.
