= Fuchsia lehmannii =

Conservation status
- Near Threatened (IUCN 3.1)

Scientific classification
- Kingdom: Plantae
- Clade: Tracheophytes
- Clade: Angiosperms
- Clade: Eudicots
- Clade: Rosids
- Order: Myrtales
- Family: Onagraceae
- Genus: Fuchsia
- Species: F. lehmannii

Binomial name
- Fuchsia lehmannii Munz

Species of flowering plant

Fuchsia lehmannii is a species of plant in the family Onagraceae. It is endemic to Ecuador.
