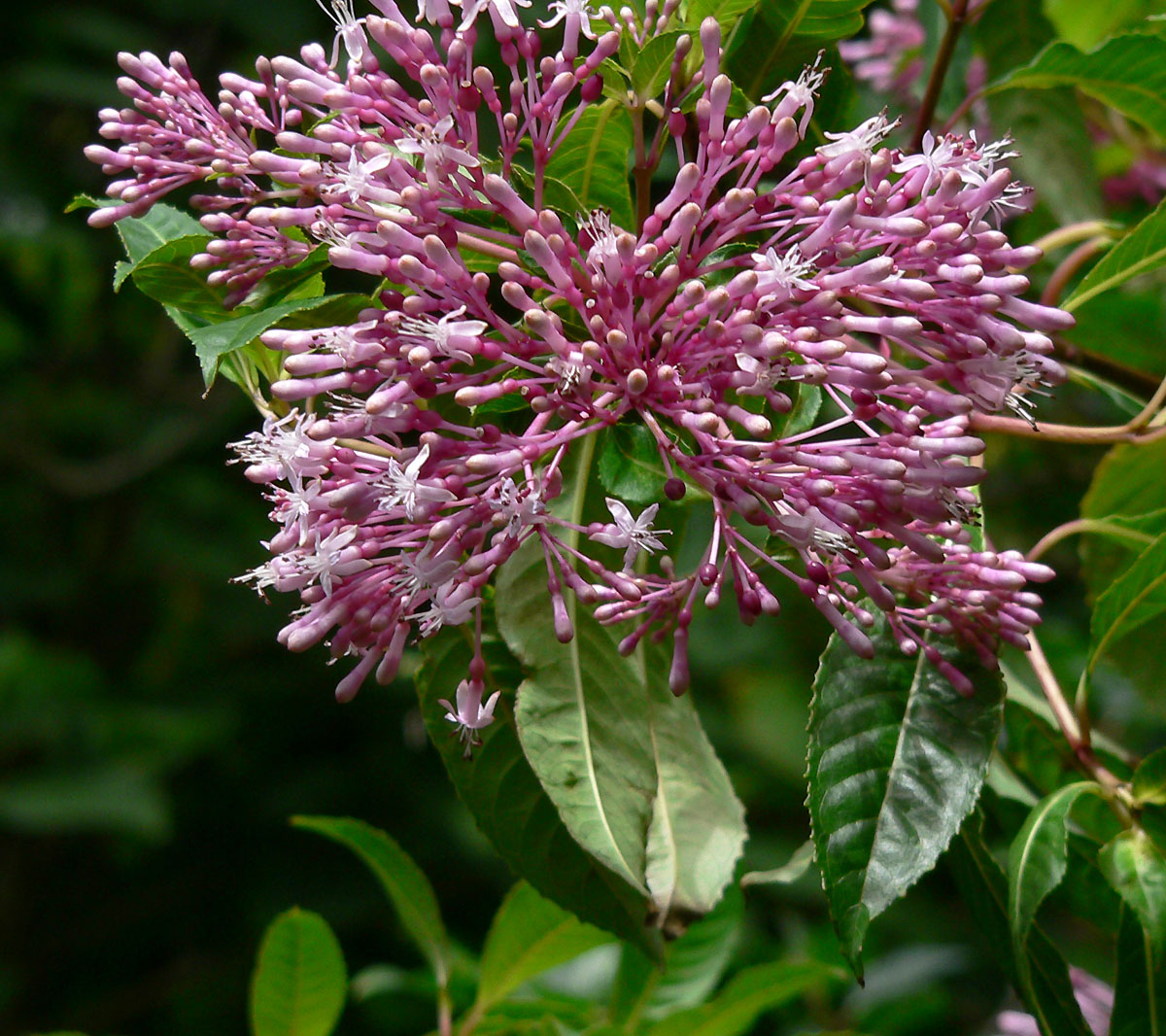

Scientific classification
- Kingdom: Plantae
- Clade: Tracheophytes
- Clade: Angiosperms
- Clade: Eudicots
- Clade: Rosids
- Order: Myrtales
- Family: Onagraceae
- Genus: Fuchsia
- Species: F. paniculata

Binomial name
- Fuchsia paniculata Lindl.

= Fuchsia paniculata =

Species of flowering plant

Fuchsia paniculata is a plant of the genus Fuchsia native to Central America. It belongs to the section Schufia and is most closely related to Fuchsia arborescens.

== Description ==
Fuchsia paniculata is a tall shrub or small tree, typically reaching 3–8 metres (9.8–26.2 ft) in height. It usually has smooth, erect branches.

The fruit is nearly round, 4-9 mm long and 4-7 mm thick, with a bluish-purple color and a whitish, waxy coating. The seeds are 1-1.4 mm long and 0.5-0.8 mm thick.

== Subspecies ==
There are two recognized subspecies:

| Image | Name | Description | Distribution |
|---|---|---|---|
| | Fuchsia paniculata subsp. mixensis P.E.Berry & Breedlove | | Mexico (Oaxaca) |
| | Fuchsia paniculata subsp. paniculata | Plant 3-8 meters tall, leaves 5-15.5 x 2-5.5 cm | Found in Mexico (Puebla, Veracruz, and Oaxaca), Costa Rica, El Salvador, Guatemala, Honduras |
