= Henry Borron Fielding =

English botanist (1805–1851)

Henry Borron Fielding (1805 – 21 November 1851) was an English botanist. The standard author abbreviation Fielding is used to indicate this person as the author when citing a botanical name.

== Life ==
Fielding was the fifth child and only son of Henry Fielding of Myerscough House, near Garstang, Lancashire. Being of a delicate constitution he was shut out from adopting a profession, but devoted himself to the study of plants and the formation of a rich herbarium, which his ample means permitted. In 1836 he bought the herbarium of Dr. Steudel, and the next year the Prescott collection, consisting of twenty-eight thousand plants. He was elected a fellow of the Linnean Society in 1838. In 1842 he removed to a more airy house at Lancaster, where he died 21 November 1851 of a sudden attack of an inflammation of the lungs.

Fielding bequeathed the whole of his herbarium, with such of his books as were wanting in the Garden Library, to the University of Oxford. His herbarium was combined with George Claridge Druce's herbarium to create the Fielding-Druce Herbarium.

== Works ==
In 1844 Fielding published Sertum Plantarum, with figures and descriptions of 75 new or rare plants. The figures were drawn by his wife Mary, and the descriptions were written by Dr. George Gardner, who at one time had charge of the Fielding herbarium.
