= A. Alonso Aguirre =

American veterinarian, wildlife biologist

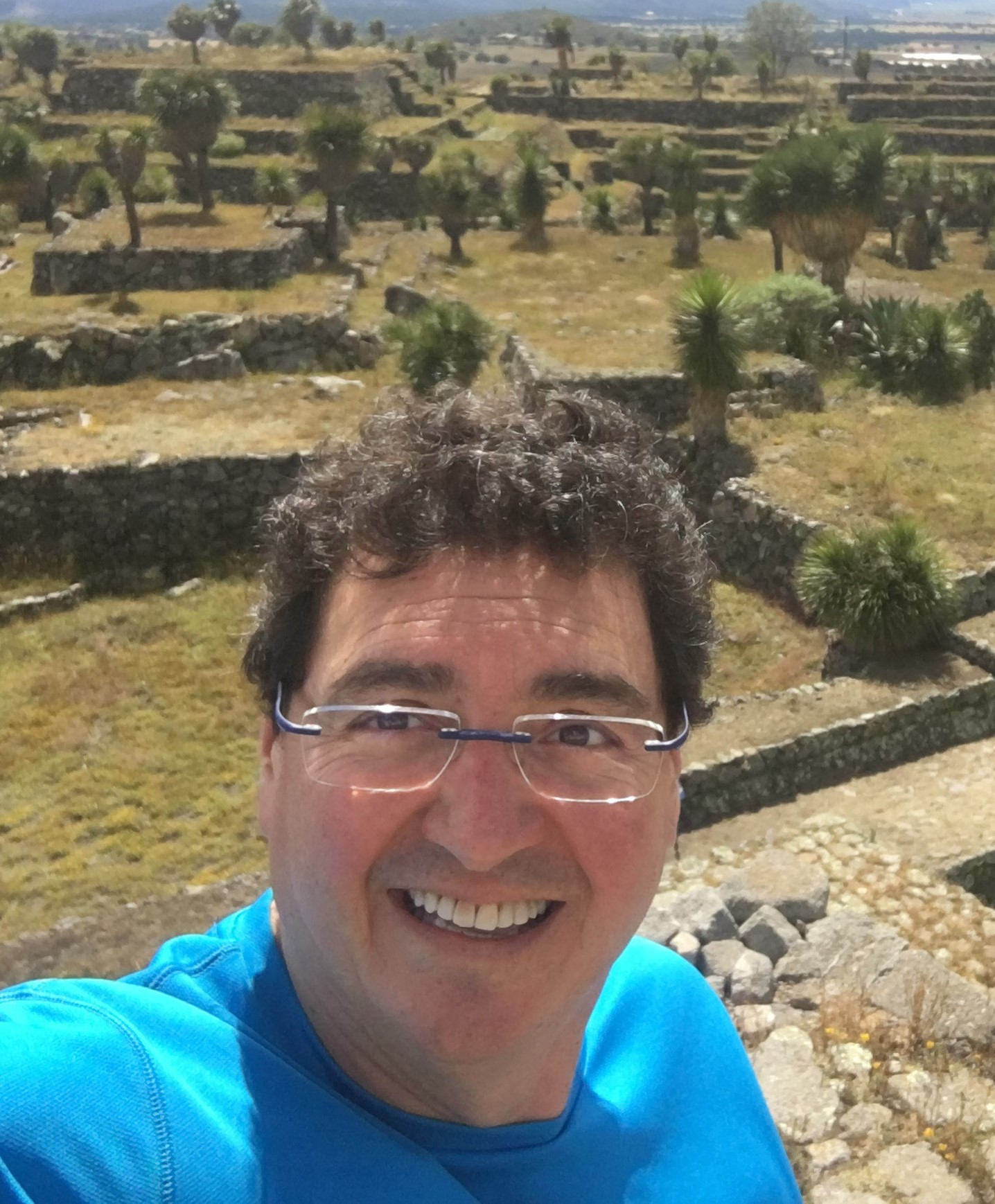
- Occupations: Veterinarian, wildlife biologist, academic and researcher
- Awards: Harry Jalanka Medal; Conservation Merit Bicentennial Award; CSU Distinguished Alumnus Award

Academic background
- Education: DVM; M.S. in Fisheries and Wildlife Biology/Environmental Health; Ph.D. in Fisheries & Wildlife Biology/Protected Areas Management, Colorado State University

Academic work
- Institutions: George Mason University; Columbia University

A. Alonso Aguirre is an American veterinarian, wildlife biologist, academic and researcher. He is Professor and Chair of the Department of Environmental Science and Policy, College of Science, and he also chairs the university Institutional Animal Care and Use Committee (IACUC) at George Mason University.

Aguirre's research is focused on the interdependence of wildlife, human beings, and their shared environments. He uses transdisciplinary methods to find new information and applications for improving conservation outcomes that also impact the protection of public health. He has also worked over the past 30 years on in the disciplines of Conservation Medicine, EcoHealth, One Health, and Planetary Health.

== Education ==
Aguirre, born and raised in Mexico, obtained his Doctor of Veterinary Medicine at the Autonomous University of the State of Mexico in 1984. He did his veterinary internship in 1987 at the USGS National Wildlife Health Center. He completed his M.S. in Fisheries and Wildlife Biology/Environmental Health in 1987 and his Ph.D. in 1990 from the Fishery, Wildlife and Conservation Biology Department at Colorado State University followed by a postdoc in wildlife epidemiology with the National Park Service and the Veterinary College at Oregon State University.

== Career ==
Aguirre was a research assistant in the Department of Fishery and Wildlife Biology at the Colorado State University during his graduate studies from 1985 to 1990 and an Associate Editor for Wildlife Disease Review in 1989. He did a postdoc at the College of Veterinary Medicine, Oregon State University, from 1990 to 1992 and served as a research wildlife veterinarian from 1992 to 1996 at the Wildlife Laboratories. After a sabbatical with the National Veterinary Institute, Uppsala, Sweden, he became a wildlife epidemiologist with NOAA National Marine Fisheries Service Protected Species Investigations, Honolulu Laboratory in 1996. At the Wildlife Trust, he served as an International Field Wildlife Veterinarian in 1998. Then, served as Director for Conservation Medicine from 2001 to 2008, after which he was Senior Vice President for the Conservation Medicine Program for Ecohealth Alliance until 2011. He served as an executive director at the Smithsonian-Mason School of Conservation and Director for the Mason Center for Conservation Studies till 2014. Since 2016, he is Professor and chair for Environmental Science and Policy Department at George Mason University.

As part of Aguirre's academic career, he was appointed as assistant professor in 1992 at Colorado State University for the Department of Fishery and Wildlife Biology. At Columbia University, he was a research professor in the Ecology, Evolution & Environmental Biology Department from 1998 to 2011 and has been a professor at George Mason University since then.

== Research ==
Aguirre's research includes the topics of wildlife anesthesia, ecology and management; ecosystem health, conservation medicine, one health and planetary health. His research is focused on uncovering the impact of emerging diseases in marine wildlife populations including manatees, monk seals and sea turtles. He co-founded the emerging discipline of Conservation medicine, with Mary C. Pearl and Gary Tabor, expanding the One Health approach to the environment, animals and people.

=== Infectious disease ecology ===
In a study Aguirre conducted in 2020, he searched for the exact origin of SARS-COV-2, which was unknown but the evidence pointed to the Wuhan wet market where several bats and wild animals were frequently stored and sold in close spaces and identified that in many pandemics in the past, bats were known for spreading zoonotic diseases and markets like these are the ideal conditions for viruses like COVID-19 to emerge. His research indicates that to keep future pandemics from taking place, wet markets should be banned from selling exotic animals and the illicit trade should be studied with zoonotic disease transmission and pandemics. In another paper, he gave examples of vector-borne and parasitic diseases that have persisted, emerged and re-emerged in the environment, significantly harming human and animal populations all over the world. He describes how specialists in the field of transdisciplinary and socio-ecological health umbrellas have collaborated and integrated new and established techniques for disease modelling, prediction, diagnosis, treatment, control, and prevention, and that approaches like these that mainly emphasize conservation of biodiversity for health protection provide novel opportunities for increasing the efficiency and probability of success. He also explored the spatial patterns of helminth parasite diversity on three main macroecological patterns and found that they may obey some of the macroecological relationships found in free-living species indicating that the parasites may provide support for the generality of these patterns and support promising counterexamples for others. He co-authored and co-edited two books titled Conservation Medicine: Ecological Health in Practice and New Directions in Conservation Medicine: Applied Cases of Ecological Health, providing a detailed analysis of emerging infectious diseases and pathogens from insects, plants and vertebrates. He discussed the issues of evaluating and monitoring ecological health concerns.

=== Conservation Medicine, One Health and Planetary Health ===
Aguirre and Tabor first imagined a new approach in connecting traditional veterinary and human health sciences with emerging ecological health principles. This collaboration gave rise to the concept of Conservation Medicine - precursor to the global One Health/Planetary Health movements. They published with others the seminal book Conservation Medicine: Ecological Health in Practice focusing on the study of the ecological context of health. According to a review by Robbie Ali in Environmental Health Perspectives, this books is "a welcome beginning, an invitation to help build a transdisciplinary approach to the links between conservation and health in today's world". Further, Peter Hudson in the journal TREE stated "I like to think of conservation medicine as the consequence of the human footprint on the ecological balance of disease dynamics... and drive of its contributors highlight how interdisciplinary research should be undertaken". A second book in the subject New Directions of Conservation Medicine: Applied Cases of Ecological Health was edited by Aguirre in 2012.

In an article, he introduced the One Health initiative to the SETAC membership and discussed the origin, evolution and utility of the approach as an organizational framework while highlighting the ways in which SETAC expertise will be able to benefit the One Health community In a paper in 2019, Aguirre discussed the operational criteria for One Health, which includes the protocol used for testing vector borne diseases. He discussed two case examples with the applicability of Social Ecological Systems and Resilience (SESR).

Aguirre has been active in co-developing the educational framework for the emerging field of Planetary Health, also rooted in the disciplines of Conservation Medicine, EcoHealth and One Health.

=== Wildlife conservation ===
In a book that Aguirre co-edited Tropical Conservation: Perspectives on Local and Global Priorities, he discusses the tropics and subtropics where high biodiversity has great implications for research priorities, capacity building, and policy in order to address the challenges of conserving these regions. The importance of conservation concepts along with their application are also introduced. According to a review by Vojtech Novotny and Katerina Sam in Conservation Biology, "The book provides a unique and readable exposure to conservation in Latin America, Africa, and Asia and has the potential to become a key resource on the biodiversity conservation crisis in the tropics for university professors, students, researchers, and practitioners in conservation." In his paper on The Conservative Mosaic Approach to Reduce Corruption and the Illicit Sea Turtle Take and Trade, he discussed that although reducing corruption was not the clear goal of this initiative, he focused on how the states policies and conservation efforts made by the community sound address some of the practices that lead to corruption and endanger conservation outcomes.

== Awards/honors ==
- 1998 - Harry Jalanka Memorial Medal Award, Helsinki, Finland
- 2006 - Campbell Memorial Lecture College of Veterinary Medicine, Cornell University, Ithaca, New York
- 2010 - Conservation Merit Bicentennial Award, Government of the State of Mexico
- 2014 - Distinguished Alumnus Award, Colorado State University Warner College of Natural Resources Alumni Association award
- 2018 - Service Award Wildlife Disease Association Council, Lawrence, Kansas

== Bibliography ==
=== Selected articles ===
- Rush, E. R., Dale, E., & Aguirre, A. A. (2021). Illegal Wildlife Trade and Emerging Infectious Diseases: Pervasive Impacts to Species, Ecosystems and Human Health. Animals, 11(6), 1821.
- Guzmán, C. A. F., Aguirre, A. A., Astle, B., Barros, E., Bayles, B., Chimbari, M., ... & Zylstra, M. (2021). A framework to guide planetary health education. The Lancet Planetary Health, 5(5), e253-e255.
- Aguirre, A. A., Gore, M. L., Kammer-Kerwick, M., Curtin, K. M., Heyns, A., Preiser, W., & Shelley, L. I. (2021). Opportunities for transdisciplinary science to mitigate biosecurity risks from the intersectionality of illegal wildlife trade with emerging zoonotic pathogens. Frontiers in Ecology and Evolution, 9, 15.
- Aguirre, A. A., Catherina, R., Frye, H., & Shelley, L. (2020). Illicit wildlife trade, wet markets, and COVID-19: preventing future pandemics. World Medical & Health Policy, 12(3), 256–265.
- Aguirre, A. A., & Nichols, W. J. (2020). The Conservation Mosaic Approach to Reduce Corruption and the Illicit Sea Turtle Take and Trade. Targeting Natural Resource Corruption Practice Note, April, USAID, WWF, 901, U4.
- Wilcox, B. A., Aguirre, A. A., De Paula, N., Siriaroonrat, B., & Echaubard, P. (2019). Operationalizing one health employing social-ecological systems theory: lessons from the greater Mekong sub-region. Frontiers in Public Health, 7, 85.
- Aguirre, A. A., Longcore, T., Barbieri, M., Dabritz, H., Hill, D., Klein, P. N., ... & Sizemore, G. C. (2019). The one health approach to toxoplasmosis: epidemiology, control, and prevention strategies. EcoHealth, 16(2), 378–390.
- Aguirre, A. A., Basu, N., Kahn, L. H., Morin, X. K., Echaubard, P., Wilcox, B. A., & Beasley, V. R. (2019). Transdisciplinary and social-ecological health frameworks—Novel approaches to emerging parasitic and vector-borne diseases. Parasite epidemiology and control, 4, e00084.
- Dallas, T., Gehman, A. L. M., Aguirre, A. A., Budischak, S. A., Drake, J. M., Farrell, M. J., ... & Morales-Castilla, I. (2019). Contrasting latitudinal gradients of body size in helminth parasites and their hosts. Global Ecology and Biogeography, 28(6), 804–813.
- Dallas, T. A., Aguirre, A. A., Budischak, S., Carlson, C., Ezenwa, V., Han, B., ... & Stephens, P. R. (2018). Gauging support for macroecological patterns in helminth parasites. Global Ecology and Biogeography, 27(12), 1437–1447.
