= Gary Tabor =

American environmentalist

Gary Martin Tabor is an American conservationist with more than 40 years' experience working on behalf of large-scale conservation internationally as well as 12 years as a leader within the U.S. environmental philanthropic community. Tabor is known for his role as a catalyst in forwarding progress through large landscape conservation, pioneering the fields of Conservation Medicine and EcoHealth, and advising agencies and organizations about contemporary environmental issues.

He is the Founder and CEO of the Center for Large Landscape Conservation, an NGO that focuses on conserving nature at large scale through ecological corridors and protected area ecological networks. Tabor is also a Professor of "Conservation" Practice at Cornell University in the Department of Natural Resources and the Environment. He serves as Chair of the IUCN World Commission on Protected Areas' Connectivity Conservation Specialist Group, which connects 1,300 scientists from 135 countries. Tabor has worked on behalf of large landscape conservation internationally on every continent except Antarctica.

Tabor’s conservation achievements include the establishment of Kibale National Park in Uganda; the establishment of the World Bank’s Mgahinga-Bwindi Impenetrable Forest Mountain Gorilla Conservation Trust in Uganda; co-founding the Yellowstone to Yukon Conservation Initiative; pioneering the field of Conservation Medicine — the precursor to One Health; co-founding Patagonia Company’s Freedom to Roam wildlife corridor campaign and co-founding the Network for Landscape Conservation. Tabor is a recipient of the Australian American Fulbright Scholar Award in Climate Change and the Henry Luce Scholar Award. He is a co-founder of the Australian Environmental Grantmakers Network.

Tabor is an Adjunct Associate Professor at the University of Queensland, Australia. He is a member of the Conservation Committee of the National Aquarium in Baltimore and serves on the US board of Bush Heritage Australia, a land trust that manages roughly 2% of all lands in Australia.

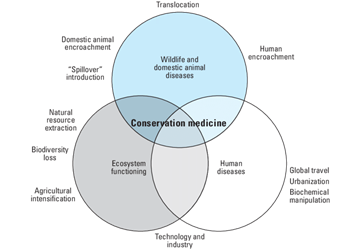
Tabor developed the three-circle diagram that defines the fields of Conservation Medicine and later One Health

== Education ==
Trained as a wildlife veterinarian and ecologist, Tabor graduated in 1981 with a B.Sc. in Ecology from Cornell University. He then went on to receive his V.M.D. in Wildlife Veterinary Medicine from the University of Pennsylvania in 1987. Tabor also received an M.E.S. in Conservation Biology from Yale University in 1992.

== Career ==
Tabor is the founder and CEO of the Center for Large Landscape Conservation, which was established in 2007. He is the former Director of the North America Program for the Wildlife Conservation Society.

== Awards, appointments and philanthropic activities ==
· 2024: Distinguished Landscape Practitioner Award – International Association of Landscape Ecology

·Chair, Connectivity Conservation Specialist Group, IUCN World Commission on Protected Areas

·2013-2014 Professional Fulbright Scholar on Climate Change and Clean Energy

·Senior Conservation Fellow, Center for Natural Resources and Environmental Policy, University of Montana

·Adjunct Associate Professor, Division of Biological Sciences, University of Queensland, Australia

·Member of the Conservation Committee of the National Aquarium in Baltimore

·Member on the US board of Bush Heritage Australia

·Former elected member to the Board of Governors of the Society for Conservation Biology. He is also a member of the Phi Zeta, the Veterinarian Honor Society, and was awarded a Henry Luce Scholar grant.

·Previously served as the Environment Program Officer for the Geraldine R. Dodge Foundation, the Associate Director of the Henry P. Kendall Foundation, and the program director for the Wilburforce Foundation.

== Institutional Leadership ==
- Founder of the Center for Large Landscape Conservation
- Co-founder Yellowstone to Yukon Conservation Initiative
- Co-founder Heart of the Rockies Conservation Initiative
- Co-founder Network for Landscape Conservation
- Co-founder Roundtable of the Crown of the Continent
- Co-founder Makerere University Biological Field Station Kibale Forest
- Co-founder Bwindi Mgahinga Mountain Gorilla Trust
- Co-founder of Australian Environmental Grantmakers Network
- Co-Founder and Strategic Designer Freedom to Roam Campaign

== Publications ==
- Plowright, R.K., Ahmed, A.N., Coulson, T., Crowther, T.W., Ejotre, I., Faust, C.L., Frick, W.F., Hudson, P.J., Kingston, T., Nameer, P.O., O’Mara, M.T., Peel, A.J., Possingham, H., Razgour, O., Reeder, D.M., Ruiz, M., Simmons, N.B., Srinivas, P.N., Tabor, G.M., Tanshi, I., Thompson, I.G., Vanak, A.T., Vora, N.M., Willison, C.E., and Keeley, A. T.H., 2024. Ecological countermeasures to prevent pathogen spillover and subsequent pandemics. Nature Communications, 15(1), p. 2577.
- Reaser, J.K., Chitale, R.A., Tabor, G.M., Hudson, P.J. and Plowright, R.K., 2023. Looking Left: Ecologically Based Biosecurity to Prevent Pandemics. Health security.
- Patterson, C., Torres, A., Coroi, M., Cumming, K., Hanson, M., Noble, B.F., Tabor, G.M., Treweek, J., Iglesias-Merchan, C. and Jaeger, J.A., 2023. Pathways for improving the consideration of ecological connectivity in environmental assessment: lessons from five case studies. Impact Assessment and Project Appraisal, 41(5), pp. 374–390.
- Chapman C. A., Abernathy K., Chapman L.J., Downs C., Effiom E.O., Gogarten J.F., Golooba M., Kalbitzer U. Lawes M. J., Mekonnen A., Omeja P. Razafindratsima O., Sheil D., Tabor G.M., Tumwesigye C., and Sarkar D. 2022. "The future of sub-Saharan Africa’s biodiversity in the face of climate and societal change." Frontiers in Ecology and Evolution. 744.
- Reaser, J. K., and G. M. Tabor. 2022. Land Use-Induced Spillover: Considerations for Urban Mitigation Planning. Biophilic Cities Journal. April.
- Plowright, R. K., J. K. Reaser, H. Locke, S. J. Woodley, J. A. Patz, D. Becker, G. Oppler, P. Hudson, and G. M. Tabor. 2021. Land use-induced spillover: a call to action to safeguard environmental, animal, and human health. The Lancet Planetary Health. * Cover article.
- Reaser, J. K., A. Witt, G. M. Tabor, P. J. Hudson, and R. K. Plowright. 2021. Ecological countermeasures for preventing zoonotic disease outbreaks: when ecological restoration is a human health imperative. Restoration Ecology, e13357
- Hilty, J., Worboys, G. L., Keeley, A., Woodley, S., Lausche, B., Locke, H., ... & Tabor, G. M. (2020). Guidelines for conserving connectivity through ecological networks and corridors. IUCN, International Union for Conservation of Nature.
- Simberloff, D., Barney, J.N., Mack, R.N., Carlton, J.T., Reaser, J.K., Stewart, B.S., Tabor, G., Lane, E.M., Hyatt, W., Malcom, J.W. and Buchanan, L., 2020. US action lowers barriers to invasive species. Science (New York, NY), 367(6478), p. 636.
- Fedorca, A., Russo, I.R.M., Ionescu, O., Ionescu, G., Popa, M., Fedorca, M., Curtu, A.L., Sofletea, N., Tabor, G.M. and Bruford, M.W., 2019. Inferring fine-scale spatial structure of the brown bear (Ursus arctos) population in the Carpathians prior to infrastructure development. Scientific reports, 9(1), p. 9494.
- Reaser*, J. K., G. M. Tabor*, D. J. Becker, P. Muruthi, A. Witt, S. J. Woodley, M. Ruiz-Aravena, J. A. Patz, V. Hickey, P. J. Hudson, H. Locke, and R. K. Plowright. 2021. Land use-induced spillover: priority actions for protected and conserved area managers. PARKS (In press) *equal first authors.
- Plowright, R. K., J. K. Reaser, H. Locke, S. J. Woodley, J. A. Patz, D. Becker, G. Oppler, P. Hudson, and G. M. Tabor. 2021. A call to action: understanding land use-induced zoonotic spillover to protect environmental, animal, and human health. Lancet Planetary Health.
- Reaser, J. K., A. Witt, G. M. Tabor, P. J. Hudson, and R. K. Plowright. 2021. Ecological countermeasures for pandemic prevention. Ecological Restoration.
- Belote, R.T., Beier, P., Creech, T., Wurtzebach, Z. and Tabor, G., 2019. A Framework for Developing Connectivity Targets and Indicators to Guide Global Conservation Efforts. BioScience.
- Keeley, A.T.H., Beier, P., Creech, T., Jones, K., Jongman, R., Stonecipher, G. and Tabor, G.M., 2019. Thirty years of connectivity conservation planning: an assessment of factors influencing plan implementation. Environmental Research Letters. 30 Sept.
- Tabor, G., Bankova-Todorova, M., Ayram, C., Andrés, C., Garcia, L.C., Kapos, V., Olds, A. and Stupariu, I., 2019. Ecological Connectivity: A Bridge to Preserving Biodiversity-Frontiers 2018/19: Emerging Issues of Environmental Concern Chapter 2. Frontiers 2018/19: Emerging Issues of Environmental Concern. United Nations Environment Program.
- Bixler, R.P., M. Reuling, S. Johnson, S. Higgins, S. Williams and G.M. Tabor. 2017. The Crown of the Continent: A Case Study of Collaborative Climate Adaptation. Encyclopedia of the Anthropocene. Elsevier.
- Curtin C.G., and G.M. Tabor. 2016. Large Landscape Conservation: Addressing the Realities of Scale and Complexity, Reference Module in Earth Systems and Environmental Sciences, Elsevier, 08-Feb-2016
- Plowright, R.K., Eby P., Hudson P.J., Smith I.L., Westcott D., Bryden W.L., Middleton D., Reid P.A., McFarlane R.A., Martin G., Tabor G.M. 2015. Ecological dynamics of emerging bat virus spillover. Proceedings of the Royal Society of London B: Biological Sciences. Jan 7;282(1798):20142124.
- Tabor, G.M., A. Carlson and T. Belote. 2014. Challenges and opportunities for large landscape-scale management in a shifting climate: The importance of nested adaptation responses across geospatial and temporal scales. In Forest Conservation in the Anthropocene. US Forest Service, Pinchot Institute. DC
- G. M. Tabor, M. McKinney, and P. Brown. 2014. The University of Montana, Missoula: A Campus with an Ecosystem. In Conservation Catalysts: How Academics and Researchers are Advancing Large Landscape Preservation. Levitt JN, editor. Lincoln Institute Press.
- Hannah, L., Roehrdanz, P. R., Ikegami, M., Shepard, A. V., Shaw, M. R., Tabor, G., & Hijmans, R. J. 2013. Climate change, wine, and conservation. Proceedings of the National Academy of Sciences, 110(17), 6907- 6912.
- Cross, M., E. Zavaleta, D. Bachelet, M. Brooks, C. Enquist, E. Fleishman, L. Graumlich, C. Groves, L. Hannah, and G. M. Tabor. 2012 A climate change adaptation framework for natural resource conservation and management. Environmental Management.
- Aguirre, A.A., G. M. Tabor, and R. Ostfield. 2012. Conservation Medicine—A Ten Year Perspective. In: Aguirre, A. A. Conservation Medicine: Ecological Health in Practice. Oxford University Press, New York.
- R. K. Plowright, P. C. Cross, G. M. Tabor, E. Almberg, L. Bienen, P. Hudson. 2012. Climate-change adaptation and disease dynamics. In: Aguirre, A. A. Conservation Medicine: Ecological Health in Practice. Oxford University Press, New York.
- Noss, R.F., A. Dobson, R. Baldwin, P. Beier, D. DellaSala, J. Francis, H. Locke, K. Nowak, R.R. Lopez, C. Reining, S. Trombulak, and G. M. Tabor. 2012. Bolder thinking for conservation. Conservation Biology.26:1-4.
- Cross, M., J.A. Hilty, G. M. Tabor, J.J. Lawler, L. J. Graumlich and J. Berger. 2011 From connect-the-dots to dynamic networks: Maintaining and restoring connectivity as a strategy to address climate change impacts on wildlife. In “Conserving wildlife populations in a changing climate”. ( J. Brodie, E. Post, D. Doak, eds.). Chicago University Press.
- M.A. Rudd, K. F. Beazley, S. J. Cooke, E. Fleishman, D. E. Lane, M. B. Mascia, R. Roth, and G. Tabor. 2011. Generation of priority research questions to inform conservation policy and management at a national level for Canada. Conservation Biology 25(3): 476-484
- Tabor, G.M. 2010. Foreword. In Connectivity Conservation Management: A Global Guide. (G.L. Worboys, W.L. Francis and M. Lockwood, eds.) Earthscan. London
- Reaser J. K., B.E. Hunt, M. Ruiz-Aravena, G. M. Tabor, J.A. Patz, D. J. Becker, H. Locke, P. J. Hudson, and R. K. Plowright. 2022. Reducing land use-induced spillover risk by fostering landscape immunity: policy priorities for conservation practitioners. Conservation Letters. Vol.15, No.3.
- Beazley, K. F., G. Oppler, L. R. Heffner, J. Levine, A. Poe, and G. M. Tabor. "Emerging policy opportunities for United States–Canada transboundary connectivity conservation." In Parks Stewardship Forum, vol. 37, no. 3. 2021.
- Oppler, G., Hilty, J.A., Laur, A.T. and G. M. Tabor, 2021. Connectivity conservation: The time is now. In Parks Stewardship Forum (Vol. 37, No. 3).
- Elliott W., M. Kinnaird, S. Malla, and G. Tabor. 2021. Ecological Connectivity: A Blueprint for Scaling Nature-Based Solutions. Chapter 2. In Pérez-Cirera, V., Cornelius, S., and Zapata, J. Powering Nature: Creating the Conditions to Enable Nature-based Solutions. WWF.
- E. Zavaleta, D. Miller, N. Salafsky, E. Fleishman, M. Weber, B. Gold, D. Hulse, M. Rowen, G. Tabor and J. Vanderryn. "Enhancing the Engagement of U.S. Private Foundations with Conservation Science". Journal of Conservation Biology. 2009. (In press).
- Plowright, R.K., H. E. Field, C. Smith, A. Divljan, C.Palmer, G. Tabor, P. Daszak, J. E. Foley. 2008. Reproduction and nutritional stress are risk factors for Hendra virus infection in little red flying foxes (Pteropus scapulatus). Proc.R. Soc. B. 275:861-869 April.
- D. Lindenmayer, R. Hobbs, R. Montague-Drake, J. Alexandra, A. Bennett, M. Burgman, P. Cale, V. Cramer, P. Cullen, D. Driscoll, J. Franklin, Y. Haila, M. Hunter, P. Gibbons, S. Lake, G. Luck, C. MacGregor, S. McIntyre, R. MacNally, A. Manning, J. Miller, H. Mooney, R. Noss, H. Possingham, D. Saunders, F. Schmiegelow, M. Scott, D. Simberloff, T. Sisk, G. Tabor, B. Walker, J. Wiens, J. Woinarski, and E. Zavaleta. "A Checklist for Ecological Management of Landscapes for Conservation". Ecology Letters. October 2007.
- L. Bienen and G. Tabor. "Applying an Ecosystem Approach to Brucellosis Control: Can an Old Conflict Between Wildlife and Agriculture Be Successfully Managed?" Frontiers in Ecology and the Environment. 2006; 4(6): 319-327.
- H. Locke and G. Tabor. "The Future of Y2Y" in Yellowstone to Yukon: Freedom to Roam, F. Schulz. The Mountaineers Books. 2005. Seattle.
- G. Tabor and H. Locke. 2004. "Yellowstone to Yukon Conservation Initiative" in Managing Mountain Protected Areas: Challenges and Responses for the 21st Century. David Harmon and Graeme Worboys (eds). Colledara, Italy, Andromeda Editrice. 429 pp.
- P. Daszak, G. Tabor, A. Marm Kilpatrick, et al. "Conservation Medicine and a New Agenda for Emerging Diseases". Annals of the New York Acadademy of Sciences. 2004; 1026:1-11.
- J.A. Patz, P. Daszak, G. Tabor, et al. "Unhealthy Landscapes: Policy Recommendations on Land Use Change and Disease Emergence". Environmental Health Perspectives. 2004. Vol. 112:10 1092-1098.
- G. Tabor and A.A. Aguirre. "Ecosystem Health and Sentinel Species: Adding an Ecological Element to the Proverbial 'Canary in the Mineshaft'”. Ecohealth. September 2004. Vol. 1:3.
- Aguirre, A.A. and G.M. Tabor. 2004. Marine Vertebrates as Sentinels of Marine Ecosystem Health. EcoHealth. Vol. 1:3 September
- A.A. Aguirre, R.S. Ostfeld, G. Tabor, C.A. House and M.C. Pearl (eds.). Conservation Medicine: Ecological Health in Practice. 2002. Oxford University Press, New York, 407 pp.
- Tabor, G.M. 2002. Defining Conservation Medicine. In: Aguirre, A. A., R. S. Ostfeld, G. M. Tabor, C. A. House and M. C. Pearl (eds.). 2002. Conservation Medicine: Ecological Health in Practice. Oxford University Press, New York.
- G. Tabor, R.S. Ostfeld, M. Poss, A.P. Dobson, and A.A. Aguirre, "Conservation Biology and the Health Sciences: Defining the Research Priorities of Conservation Medicine" in Research Priorities in Conservation Biology. M.E. Soulé and G.H. Orians (eds.). 2001. 2nd edition. Island Press; Washington, D.C.
- C.M. Gillin, G. Tabor, and A.A. Aguirre. 2002. "Ecological Health and Wildlife Disease Management in National Parks" in Conservation Medicine: Ecological Health in Practice. A.A., Aguirre, R.S. Ostfeld, G. Tabor, C.A. House and M.C. Pearl (eds.). 2002. Oxford University Press, New York.
- Tabor, G.M., R.S. Ostfeld, M. Poss, A.P. Dobson, and A.A. Aguirre, 2001. Conservation Biology and the Health Sciences: Defining the Research Priorities of Conservation Medicine. In: M.E. Soulé and G.H. Orians.eds. Research Priorities in Conservation Biology. 2nd edition. Island Press; Washington, D.C.
- Carr III, A., F. Arengo, and G.M. Tabor, 2000. Linking landscapes in a new millennium: Ecological Corridor of the Americas. Newsletter of the Society for Conservation Biology. Nov. 11.
- Pokras M., G.M. Tabor, M. Pearl, D. Sherman and P. Epstein, 1999. Conservation Medicine: an emerging field. In Nature and human society: the quest for a sustainable world. National Academy Press. Washington, DC. pp: 551-556
- Tabor, G.M., A.D. Johns, and J.M. Kasenene. 1991. Deciding the future of Uganda's tropical forests.ORYX 24:2 208-14 Oct.

== See also ==
- Conservation medicine
- Climate Adaptation
- Wildlife corridor
- Harvey Locke
