= Canadian Parks and Wilderness Society =

Canadian environmental organization

- Predecessor: National and Provincial Parks Association (NPPAC)
- Formation: 1963
- Type: Environment
- Purpose: Help protect Canada's wilderness.
- Location: Canada
- Region served: Canada
- National Executive Director: Sandra Schwartz
- Website: www.cpaws.org

The Canadian Parks and Wilderness Society (CPAWS) (French: la Société pour la nature et les parcs du Canada (SNAP)) was founded in 1963 to help protect Canada's wilderness.

== Activities ==
CPAWS was formed in 1963 as National and Provincial Parks Association. It has chapters in each province and territory.

In 1972, CPAWS established the James B. Harkin Conservation Award, which is awarded to Canadians who promote conservation including Harvey Locke (2013), Mike Harcourt (2003), Elizabeth May (2002), Stephen Herrero (1999), Jennifer Shay (1992), Andy Russell, (1990), Charles Sauriol (1985) and Jean Chrétien (1972).

Between 1982 and 1993, the organisation published the Park News: The Journal of the National and Provincial Parks Association of Canada as an "outlet for a variety of articles on Canadian parks that will be of interest to the general public."

In 2015, Mountain Equipment Coop (MEC) partnered with CPAWS as the project sponsor for the "MEC Big Wild Challenge" to encourage people to connect more with nature by being more active outdoors. This included a challenge for individuals to complete a specific Trail Run on September 19 in participating municipalities or to design their own outdoors in nature challenge. The overall goal was to protect the wilderness.

Their 2016 report subtitled, "Protecting Canada's National Parks a Call for Renewed Commitment to Nature Conservation", was submitted as evidence to the House of Commons Standing Committee on Environment and Sustainable Development. The CPAWS parks program director, Alison Woodley, and Sabine Jessen, CPAWS' national director of their oceans program, were invited expert witnesses in discussions at a May 5, 2016 meeting of the House of Commons of Canada.
