= Harvey Locke =

Canadian conservationist

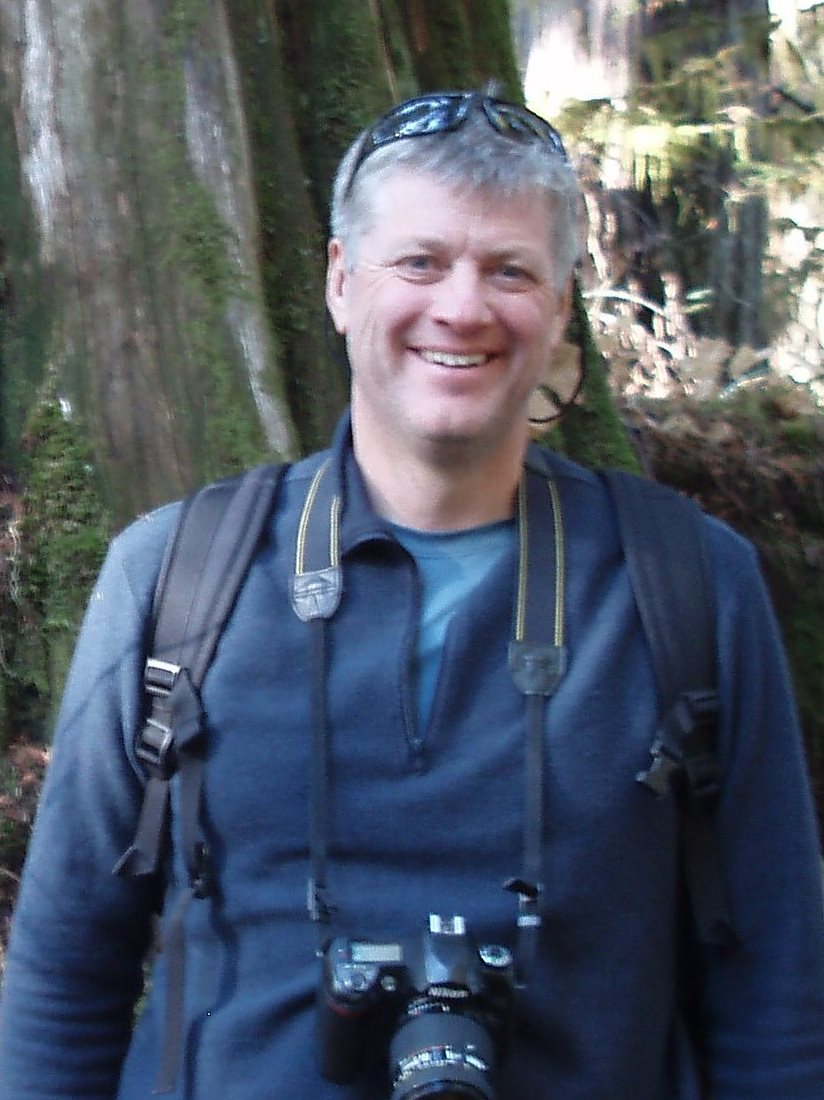
- Born: Gerald Timothy Harvey Locke; May 22, 1959 (age 67); Calgary, Alberta, Canada
- Scientific career
- Fields: Wilderness protection, biodiversity conservation, national parks, large landscape conservation and climate change
- Workplaces: Yellowstone to Yukon Conservation Initiative IUCN World Commission on Protected Areas

Harvey Locke is a Canadian conservationist, writer, and photographer. He is a recognized global leader in the field of parks, wilderness, wildlife and large landscape conservation. He is a founder of the Yellowstone to Yukon Conservation Initiative, with the goal to create a continuous corridor for wildlife from Yellowstone National Park in the United States to the Yukon in Northern Canada. In 2017, Locke was appointed chair of the IUCN World Commission on Protected Areas Beyond the Aichi Targets Task Force, with the goal of ensuring the new global conservation targets set at the next Conference of the Parties of the Convention on Biological Diversity in 2020 are meaningful for achieving the conservation of nature and halting of biodiversity loss.

In 1999 Locke was named one of Canada's leaders for the 21st century by Time magazine Canada. In 2013, he received the J.B. Harkin Medal for Conservation and the Queen Elizabeth II Diamond Jubilee Medal and in 2014 he was awarded the Fred M. Packard Award for outstanding service to protected areas by the IUCN World Commission on Protected Areas at the World Parks Congress in Sydney, Australia. Locke also received in 2014 the Gold Leaf Award from the Canadian Council on Ecological Areas for his lifetime of extraordinary commitment and vision to advance the cause of parks, wilderness, ecological integrity and landscape connectivity in North America and the world. Locke is a co-founder of the Nature Needs Half Movement.

== Personal life ==
Locke (full name Gerald Timothy Harvey Locke) was born in 1959 to Ralphine Locke (née Harvey) and Dr. Gerald Lorne Locke, in Calgary, Alberta. His family counts among Southern Alberta's earliest European settlers and has been in the Bow Valley since the early 1870s. He grew up in southern Alberta where he attended Earl Grey Elementary School and Strathcona School for Boys in Calgary and in 1975 graduated from Strathcona-Tweedsmuir School, (Nil Nisi Optimum Notable Alumnus), in Dewinton, Alberta. In 1976, he spent a year in College Wildhorn, in Anzere, Switzerland. Back in Calgary, he first obtained a Bachelor of Arts in French and later a Bachelor of Laws in 1984 (with silver medal) from the University of Calgary. He was a lawyer and partner at MacKimmie Matthews law firm in downtown Calgary for 14 years and served as volunteer president of both Canadian Parks and Wilderness Society (CPAWS) and the Alberta Liberal Party. In 1999, Harvey became a full-time conservationist dedicated to national parks, wilderness, large landscape and connectivity conservation and climate change. He is married to Marie-Eve Marchand and has two sons by a previous marriage.

== Professional activities ==
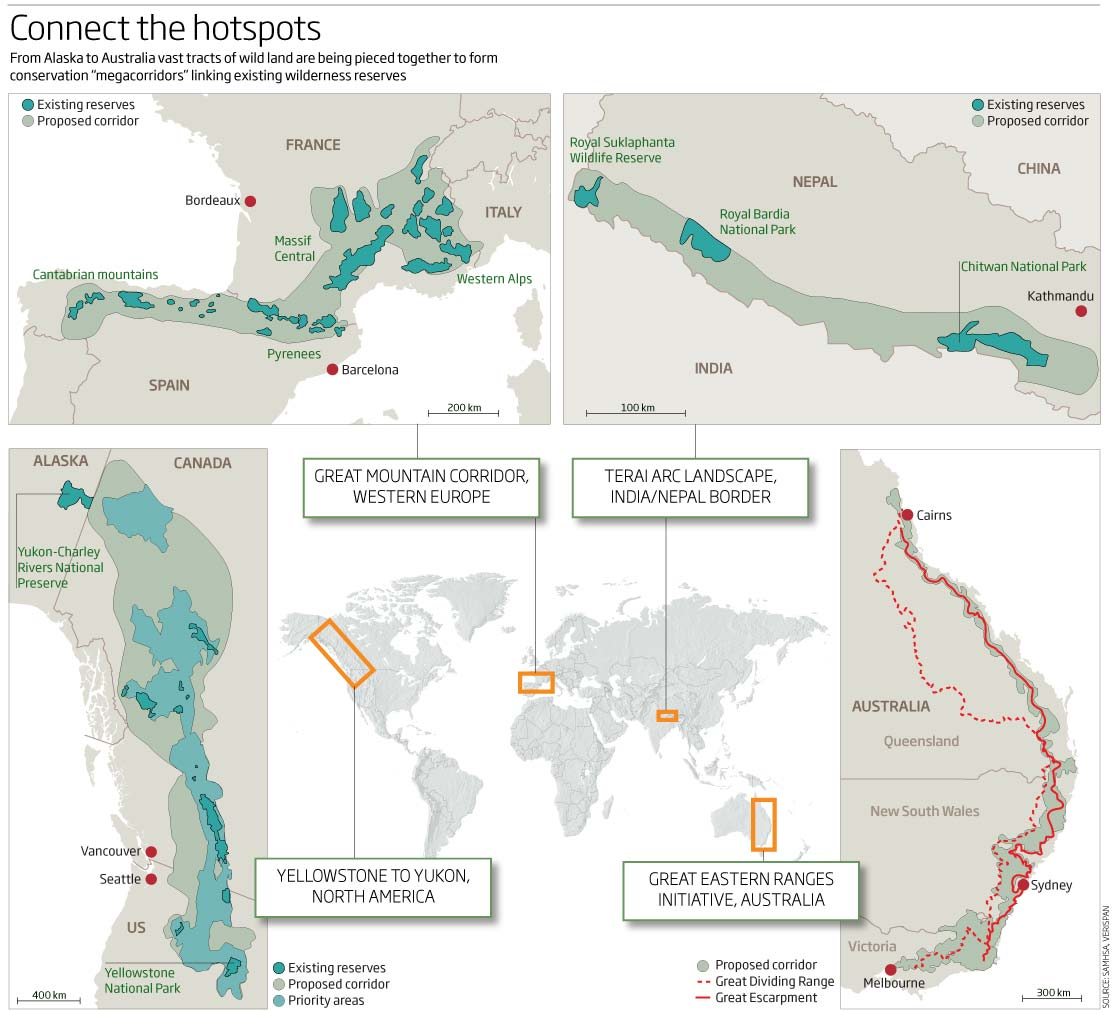
Map of 4 Connectivity Conservation projects, with Yellowstone to Yukon at the bottom left.

Locke served as president or vice president of the CPAWS for many years, and he is now its senior advisor on conservation. He is a founder and senior advisor for Yellowstone to Yukon Conservation Initiative, and was the Vice President for Conservation Strategy at the WILD Foundation in Boulder, Colorado from 2009 through 2011. Locke's writing and photography have been published in newspapers, magazines and peer reviewed journals in nine countries. He has lectured at many universities and spoken on national parks, wilderness and large landscape conservation at conferences around the world. He has testified on national parks legislation before Parliamentary committees, and led conservation campaigns. In 1999, Locke was named one of Time magazine Canada's leaders for the 21st century. In 2013, he received the J.B. Harkin Medal for Conservation and the Queen Elizabeth II Diamond Jubilee Medal.

In October 2009, Locke was invited as the keynote speaker for the inaugural Thomas Foundation Oration in conjunction with The Nature Conservancy and the Thomas Foundation Oration in Australia during that country's first Linking Landscape Summit and spoke in Sydney, Canberra and Melbourne. In 2013, he was invited to Darwin and Sydney to speak about large landscape from Kimberly to Cape and Great Eastern Ranges.

During the opening ceremony of the Ninth World Wilderness Congress (WILD9) in Mérida, Mexico on November 6, 2009, Locke addressed Mexican President Felipe Calderon on behalf of the delegates. At WILD9, the first series of stamps on wilderness was initiated by the Mexican Postal Service and cancelled by the President Calderon to celebrate Tierras Sylvestres. The series celebrates five wilderness areas in Mexico, the United States, Canada, Russia and South Africa and a picture taken by Locke of Canada's Nahanni National Park. He gave the closing plenary at WILD 9 which launched the global Nature Needs Half movement.

Locke has been invited to engage on parks and wilderness in Europe. He spoke at the Czech EC Presidency Conference on Wilderness in Prague, Czech Republic in 2009, gave a keynote speech on Europe's National Parks in a global context for Europarc Federation in Abruzzo, Italy in October 2010, spoke at the Belgian EC Presidency Conference on Wilderness Restoration in Brussels in November 2010, and at the launch of the Rewilding Europe initiative in Brussels, November 2010. In 2013, he chaired the plenary session on Nature Needs Half and spoke at WILD 10 in Salamanca, Spain.

In 2013, Locke spoke in Ootacamund and in Mumbai, India about large landscape conservation and Nature Needs Half and wrote a feature story on those ideas for Sanctuary Asia.

Locke is a frequent keynote speaker at major conservation conferences and universities throughout North America. In 2013, he was the distinguished visiting lecturer at the University of Montana and Montana State University Institute on Ecosystems. He gave keynote speeches in Banff, Canada on International Leadership, Parks Canada's Contribution to the world at the official 125th anniversary celebration of Canada's National Park System in November 2010 and at the Sixteenth Annual Symposium of the Stegner Center, Wildlife Conservation in the 21st Century on Large Landscape Conservation in March 2011.

Locke conceived and co-curated the 2011 art show, Yellowstone to Yukon: the Journey of Wildlife and Art, a collaboration of the National Museum of Wildlife Art, Jackson, WY, the Whyte Museum of the Canadian Rockies, Banff, Canada, artist Dwayne Harty, and the Yellowstone to Yukon Conservation Initiative

He is a past board member of the Nature Conservancy of Montana, as well as past president and director emeritus of the Wildlands Project (now the Wildlands Network). He also served as program advisor to Tides Canada Foundation and to the Canadian Boreal Initiative. He was also senior program officer for the environment at the Henry P. Kendall Foundation in Boston, Massachusetts. He serves on the World Commission on Protected Areas; and served on the executive committees of the Eighth World Wilderness Congress and Ninth World Wilderness Congress (WILD9); a board member of the Freedom to Roam initiative; and trustee of the Eleanor Luxton Historical Foundation in Banff. Locke is also a fellow of the Royal Canadian Geographical Society.

== Photography and media ==
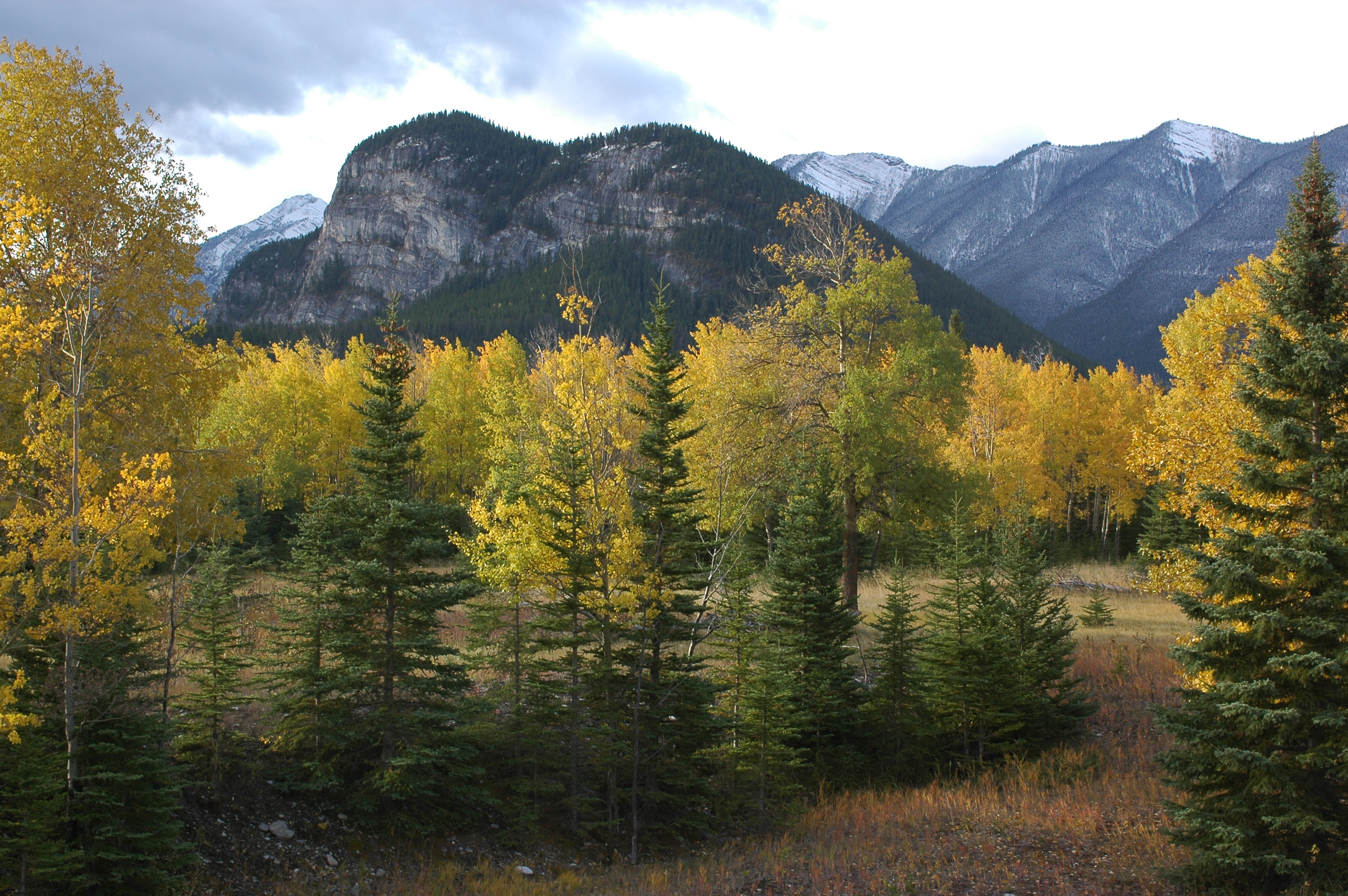
Tunnel Mountain, Banff, from the north. Photo by Harvey Locke.

Locke's photography has been published in numerous books, magazines, websites and newspapers including The New York Times, Wildlife Conservation, Canadian Geographic, Backpacker, The Globe and Mail, Vancouver Sun, Agence France-Presse, Aeroméxico in-flight magazine Escala, and Sanctuary Asia.

Locke has done interviews with all varieties of media including the Los Angeles Times, The Washington Post, National Public Radio, Nippon Television, National Geographic, The Nature of Things, La Presse, The Globe and Mail, National Post, Géo Plein Air , Backpacker and several documentary films, including a 10-minute feature on CBC National News, September 2008 and on Découverte à Radio-Canada, and Star Alliance and National Geographic partnership (Biosphere Connections), and Der Spiegel TV ZDF in Germany

His photographs are used extensively by conservation groups around the world and were shown at the American Museum of Natural History for the Yellowstone to Yukon exhibit in 2006. They were also featured in the iPad portion of the 2011 exhibit: Yellowstone to Yukon: the Journey of Wildlife and Art at the National Museum of Wildlife Art and a companion photo exhibit the Whyte Museum of the Canadian Rockies.

== Politics ==
Locke was the Liberal candidate in the provincial district of Calgary-Foothills in the 1989 Alberta provincial election, narrowly losing to Progressive Conservative Pat Black. He went on to serve as President of the Alberta Liberal Party from 1995 to 1997, and chaired the party's 1997 election campaign. In the Summer of 2012 Locke announced he would seek the Liberal Party of Canada nomination in the riding of Calgary Centre, which had been left vacant after the resignation of Conservative Lee Richardson. On September 22, 2012, he won 213 of 342 ballots cast in the party's nomination contest, defeating three other candidates.

=== Electoral record ===
1989 Alberta general election: Calgary-Foothills
Party	Candidate	Votes	%	±%
Progressive Conservative	Patricia Black	5,341	37.25%	-18.07%
Liberal	Harvey Locke	4,866	33.93%	18.17%
New Democratic	Theresa Catherine Baxter	4,133	28.82%	5.54%
Total		14,340	–	–
Rejected, spoiled and declined		43	–	–
Eligible electors / turnout		23,779	60.49%	11.98%
Progressive Conservative hold		Swing		-14.36%
Source(s) Source: "Calgary-Foothills Official Results 1989 Alberta general election". Alberta Heritage Community Foundation.

Canadian federal by-election, November 26, 2012: Calgary Centre Resignation of Lee Richardson
Party	Candidate	Votes	%	±%	Expenditures
Conservative	Joan Crockatt	10,191	36.87	–20.81	$95,251
Liberal	Harvey Locke	9,033	32.68	+15.15	$97,025
Green	Chris Turner	7,090	25.65	+15.72	$100,180
New Democratic	Dan Meades	1,064	3.85	–11.01	$90,148
Independent	Antony Tony Grochowski	141	0.51	–	none listed
Libertarian	Tony Prashad	121	0.44	–	$255
Total valid votes/expense limit		27,640	99.67	–	$102,128.86
Total rejected ballots		92	0.33	–0.20	
Turnout		27,732	29.32	–25.96	
Eligible voters		94,582			
Conservative hold		Swing		–35.96	
Source: Elections Canada

== Sample of published articles and book contributions ==
- Locke H., et al. 2019 "Three Global Conditions for Biodiversity Conservation and Sustainable Use: an implementation framework". National Science Review. 6(6). DOI:10.1093/nsr/nwz136
- Locke H. 2017. "The International Movement to Protect Half the World: Origins, Scientific Foundations, and Policy Implications", 2017, Earth Systems and Environmental Sciences.
- Locke H. 2017. "Parks Canada's International Leadership Role on National Parks (2ed)", in National Geographic Guide to the National Parks of Canada, National Geographic, Washington DC
- E. Dinerstein, D. Olson, A. Joshi, C. Vynne, N.D. Burgess, E Wikramanayake, N. Hahn, S. Palminteri, P. Hedao, R. Noss, M. Hansen, H. Locke, et al., "An Ecoregion Approach to Protecting Half the Terrestrial Realm in Bioscience" June 2017, vol. 67 no. 6. Oxford University Press and American Institute of Biological Sciences.
- Locke H. "Nature Needs Half: a Necessary and Hopeful Agenda for Parks and Protected Areas in Vol. 58, no. 3, Spring 2014 in Nature New South Wales, Journal of the National Parks Association of NSW, Newtown, Australia
- Locke H. "The Two Albertas", April 2014, in The Literary Review of Canada, Toronto, Ontario, Canada
- Locke H. "Green Postmodernism and the Attempted Hijacking of Conservation", 2014, p. 146-62 in Keeping the Wild, G. Wuerthner, E. Crist and T. Butler eds. Island Press, Washington, DC, USA
- Locke H. "Why Nature Needs Half: a Necessary and Hopeful Agenda for Parks and Protected Areas" 2013, in Parks: The International Journal for Parks and Protected Areas vol. 19, no. 2. parks p. 9-18, IUCN, Gland, Switzerland
- Locke H. "Nature Answers Man", September–October 2013, p. 36-42, in Policy Options, Institute for Research on Public Policy, Montreal, Quebec, Canada
- Locke H. "Foreword" in Linking Australia's Landscapes; Lessons and Opportunities from Large-scale Conservation Networks, J. Fitzsimons, I. Pulsford and G. Wescott eds., in 2013, CSIRO, Collinwood, Victoria, Australia
- Locke H. and McKinney M. "Flathead Valley Flashpoint", 2013, p. 193-220, in Water Without Borders? Canada, the US and Shared Waters, E. Norman, A. Cohen, K. Bakker eds. University of Toronto Press, Toronto, Ontario, Canada
- Locke H. and Francis W. "Strategic Acquisition and Management of Small Parcels of Private Land in Key Areas to Address Habitat Fragmentation at the Scale of the Yellowstone to Yukon Region" vol 30, no 4, December 2012, p. 293-295, in Ecological Restoration, University of Wisconsin, USA
- Noss, R.F., A. Dobson, R. Baldwin, P. Beier, D. DellaSala, J. Francis, H. Locke, K. Nowak, R.R. Lopez, C. Reining, S. Trombulak, and G. Tabor, "Bolder thinking for conservation", Vol 26, 2012, p. 1-4, in Conservation Biology.
- Locke H. "Conservation Through Connections" in Practicing Sustainability, edited by G. Madhavan et al., Springer, 2012.
- Locke H. "Transboundary cooperation to achieve wilderness protection and large landscape conservation" Winter 2011–2012, volume 28, number 3, in Park Sciences, Integrating Research and Resource Management in the National Parks, National Park Service U.S. Department of the Interior and Natural Resource Stewardship and Science Office of Education and Outreach, USA
- Locke H. "Yellowstone to Yukon: the Journey of Wildlife and Art" 2011–2012 edition, in Call of the Wild, National Museum of Wildlife Art, WY, USA
- Locke H. "La moitié pour la nature" Printemps 2011 Volume 31 Numéro 2, in in Vivo abq, Le bulletin de l'association des biologistes du Québec, Montréal, Canada
- Locke H."Civil Society and Protected Areas: Lessons from Canada's Experience" 2009 in George Wright Forum, vol. 26, number 2, pp 101–128, Hancock, Michigan, USA
- Locke H. and Mackey B. "The Nature of Climate Change: Reunite International Climate Change Mitigation Efforts with Biodiversity Conservation and Wilderness Protection" 2009 in International Journal of Wilderness, Vol. 15, number 2, WILD Foundation, Boulder, Colorado, USA
- Locke H. "Canada Increases Wilderness Protection and Policy Goals" 2009 in International Journal of Wilderness, Vol. 15, number 1, WILD Foundation, Boulder, Colorado, USA
- Kormos C. and Locke H. "Introduction to the Wilderness Concept" 2008 in A Handbook on International Wilderness Law and Policy Kormos C. ed., Fulcrum Publishing, Golden, CO, USA
- Locke H. "The Need and Opportunity and Opportunity for Landscape Scale Conservation in the Yellowstone to Yukon Region: A Vision for the 21st Century" 2006, in Greater Yellowstone Public Lands: A Century of Discovery, Hard Lessons, and Bright Prospects, Proceedings of the 8th Biennial Scientific Conference on the Greater Yellowstone Ecosystem, A. Wondrak Biel ed., Yellowstone Centre for Resources, Yellowstone National Park, WY, USA
- Locke H. "The Spiritual Dimension of Moving to the Mountains" 2006, in The Amenity Migrants L.A.G. Moss ed., CABI, Oxfordshire, UK
- Locke H. and Tabor G. "Y2Y Today: Where we are and where we go from Here" 2005 in Yellowstone to Yukon:Freedom to Roam : a Photographic Journey by Florian Schulz, Mountaineers Books, Seattle, USA
- Locke H. and Dearden P. "Rethinking Protected Area Categories and the New Paradigm", Environmental Conservation 32 (1), 2005, Foundation for Environmental Conservation, Cambridge University Press, UK
- Konstant W., Locke H. and Hanna J. "Waterton- Glacier International Peace Park: The First of its Kind" 2005 in Transboundary Conservation: A New Vision for Protected Areas in R. A. Mittermeir et al. eds., Cemex-Agrupacion Sierra Madre-Conservation International, Mexico
- Locke H. "Banff National Park: Lessons Learnt form Tourism in the World's Third Oldest National Park" The Game Ranger, No. 1, 2005 Game Rangers Association of Africa, South Africa
- Locke H. "Nahanni-Boreal Headwaters of the World" 2004 in Rendezvous in the Wild, The Boreal Forest by Raffan J., The Boston Mills Press, Erin, Ontario, Canada
- Tabor G. and Locke H. "Yellowstone to Yukon Conservation Initiative" 2004, in Managing Mountain Protected Areas: Challenges and Responses for the 21st Century, D. Harmon and G. Worboys eds. Andromeda Editrice, Colledara, Italy
- Locke H. "Foreword", Parks and Protected Areas Management in Canada 2nd ed. 2002 P. Dearden and R, Rollins eds., Oxford University Press, Toronto, Ontario, Canada
- Locke H. "Keep Faith with Nature' 2000, in Crossroads R. Davies et al. eds, Gage, Toronto, Ontario, Canada
- Locke H. "Spirituality and Wilderness" in Wild Earth, Spring, 1999, Richmond, Vermont, USA
- Locke H. "Banff National Park and the Yellowstone to Yukon Corridor" 1998 in National Parks and their Contribution to Sustainable Development, Springer Verlag, Berlin, Germany
- Locke H. and Elgie S. "Using the Law to Protect Wild Places" 1996, in Protecting Canada's Endangered Spaces M. Hummel ed., Key Porter, Toronto, Ontario, Canada
- Keiter R. and Locke H. "Law and Large Carnivore Conservation in the Rocky Mountains of the United States and Canada" in Conservation Biology, vol. 10, no. 4, August 1996, Blackwell Scientific, Malden, MA, USA
- Locke H. "The Yellowstone to Yukon Conservation Initiative" in Wildlife Conservation May 1996, Wildlife Conservation Society, Bronx, NY, USA
- Locke H. "Preserving the wild heart of North America: The Wildlands Project and the Yellowstone to Yukon Biodiversity Strategy" 1994 in Borealis issue 15, Canadian Parks and Wilderness Society, Ottawa, Ontario, Canada

== See also ==
- Conservation biology
- Environmentalism
- Wilderness
- National parks
- Protected areas
- Global warming
