= One Health =

Collaborative global initiative

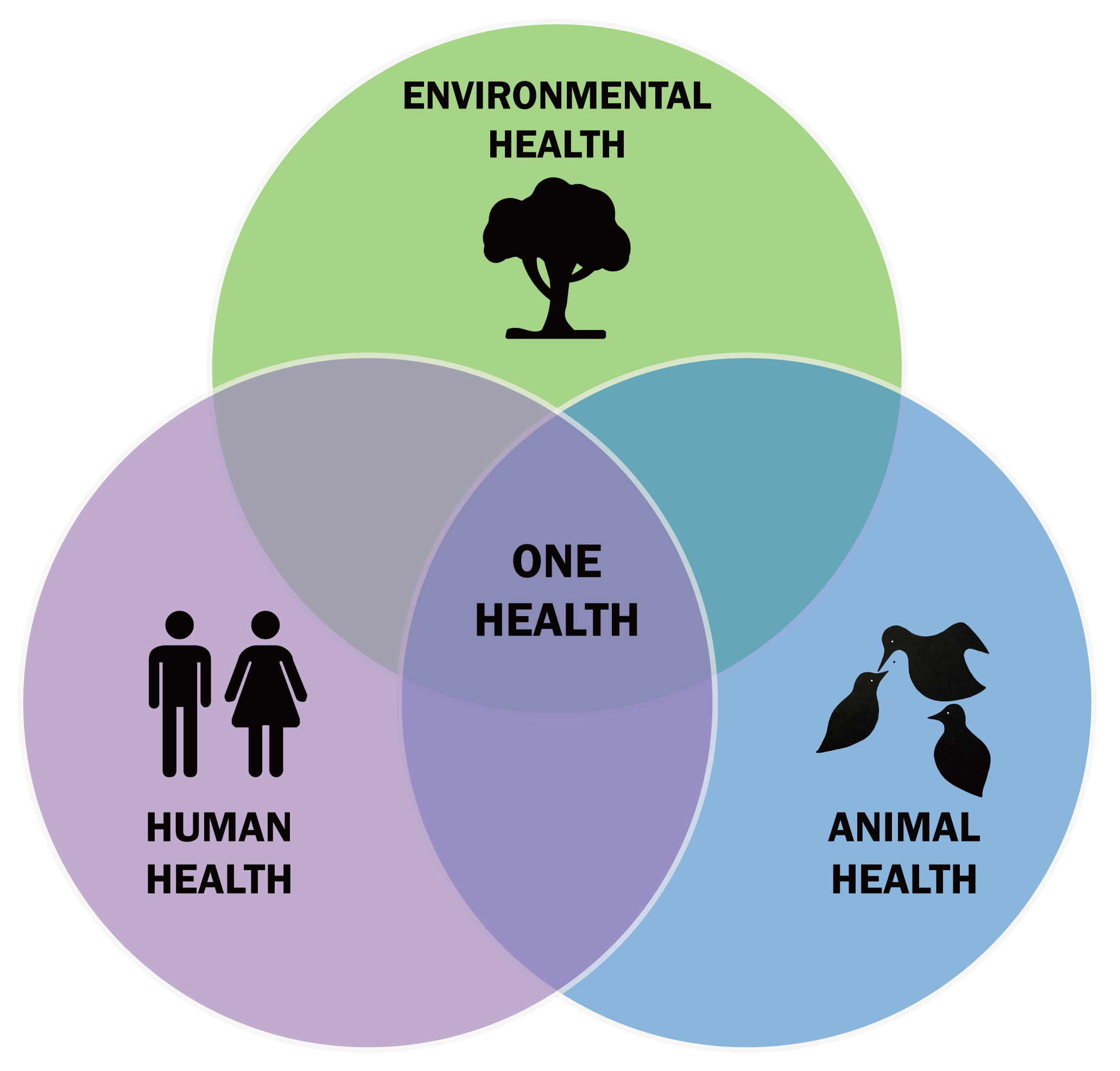
One Health is at the intersection of human health, animal health, and environmental health.

One Health is an approach calling for "the collaborative efforts of multiple disciplines working locally, nationally, and globally, to attain optimal health for people, animals and our environment", as defined by the One Health Initiative Task Force (OHITF). It developed in response to evidence of the spreading of zoonotic diseases between species and increasing awareness of "the interdependence of human and animal health and ecological change". In this viewpoint, public health is no longer seen in purely human terms. Due to a shared environment and highly conserved physiology, animals and humans not only suffer from the same zoonotic diseases but can also be treated by either structurally related or identical drugs. For this reason, special care must be taken to avoid unnecessary or over-treatment of zoonotic diseases, particularly in the context of drug resistance in infectious microbes. The One Health concept is prevalent in scientific research and highlights the close interconnection among human, animal, and environmental health, which should be examined collectively to address global health challenges effectively.

A number of organizations throughout the world support the objectives of "One Health" including the One Health Commission (OHC), One Health Initiative, One Health Platform, CDC One Health Office, Society of Infectious Diseases Pharmacists (SIDP), and the Quadripartite Organizations. The Quadripartite Organizations are:

- The Food and Agriculture Organization of the United Nations (FAO),
- The World Health Organization (WHO),
- The World Organisation for Animal Health (WOAH, formerly OIE),
- and the United Nations Environment Programme (UNEP)), and others.

One Health promotes a sustainable and healthy future through collaboration, communication, coordination and capacity building.

In particular, the One Health High Level Expert Panel, an independent advisory group to the Quadripartite Organizations, provided a comprehensive definition of One Health, whereby:

"One Health is an integrated, unifying approach that aims to sustainably balance and optimize the health of humans, animals, plants and ecosystems. It recognizes the health of humans, domestic and wild animals, plants and the wider environment (including ecosystems) are closely linked and interdependent. The approach mobilizes multiple sectors, disciplines and communities at varying levels of society to work together to foster well-being and tackle threats to health and ecosystems, while addressing the collective need for clean water, energy and air, safe and nutritious food, taking action on climate change, and contributing to sustainable development."

== History ==
In the 19th century, two leading physicians first noticed and discussed the relationship between human health and animal health, Rudolf Virchow and William Osler (who was Virchow's student). While there has been a suggestion that Olser coined the term "one medicine," there is no direct evidence to that effect.

Comparison of integrated approach in health
	Origins	Concept
Environmental health	From the 1880s Sanitary Science	Anthropocentric approach on environment influence on human health.
One Health (legacy)	Virchow and Osler (1800s) and Schwabe (1964) zoonosis	Collaboration of human medicine and veterinary.
One Medicine–One Health (modern)	Early 2000s as response to emerging infectious diseases (SARS, MERS, Ebola)	Cross-sectoral and transdisciplinary collaboration to improve health of humans, animals and ecosystems because of inter-connectedness.; Recognizes the interconnectedness of human, animal, and environmental health.; Incorporates components of food safety, antimicrobial resistance, and environmental contaminations.
Conservation medicine	1990s as health gains importance in conservation	Connection of health of animals and humans and ecosystems in situ
Comparative medicine	Since ancient time	Understanding shared or similar pathophysiological processes, which is fundamentals for medical and translational research
Ecohealth	1990s by French Canadian-based International Development Research Centre	Dependency of human and animal health and wellbeing on sustained environment.; Human and ecosystem health exists in socio-ecological interactions
Planetary health	Introduced in 1970–80s, and repopularized by Lancet Commission and Rockefeller Foundation	Anthropomorphized view of impact and interconnectedness of humans with the Earth at all levels
One Welfare	Emerged in 2015 for promotion of the links between animal welfare and human wellbeing	Highlights the interconnection of animal welfare, human wellbeing, and environment to foster interdisciplinary collaboration in order to improve human and animal welfare
Beyond One Ocean Health (B1OH)	Impacts of environmental change on health of ecosystems and organisms with emphasis on ocean	Highlights transdisciplinary actions on aquatic ecosystems, interconnected integrated systems and health through sustainable developments; Links healthy ocean with health and equity.
Public health		Population-based (instead of individual); Focus on health promotion and prevention (instead of treatment and rehabilitation); Social, cultural, economic, political, and environmental determinant of health
Global health	Supraterritoriality of health	Transboundary health threats

In its contemporary form, the concept of "One Health" is generally credited to the work of Calvin Schwabe at the University of California, Davis in the 1960s and 1970s. Schwabe, a veterinarian trained in public health, coined the term "One Medicine" in a veterinary medical textbook in 1964 to reflect the similarities between animal and human medicine and stress the importance of collaboration between veterinarians and physicians to help solve global health problems. He established a department at UC Davis to jointly address issues in the animal and human health sciences. Schwabe went on to fully rethink and develop the concept of One Medicine in 1976. Since 2009, UC Davis has continued to support the One Health movement through its One Health Institute.

In 2004, The Wildlife Conservation Society held a conference called "One World, One Health" at Rockefeller University in New York. Out of that conference the twelve Manhattan Principles were created to describe a unified approach to preventing epidemic diseases. These principles emphasized links between humans, animals, and the environment, their importance in understanding disease dynamics, and the need for interdisciplinary approaches to prevention, education, investment, and policy development.

Due to global scares surrounding the H5N1 influenza outbreaks of the early-mid 2000s, the American Veterinary Medical Association established a One Health Initiative Task Force in 2006, the American Medical Association passed a One Health resolution to promote partnering between veterinary and human medical organizations in 2007, and a One Health approach was recommended for responses to global disease outbreaks in 2007. Building on these initiatives, the Food and Agriculture Organization (FAO), World Organisation for Animal Health (OIE), and World Health Organization (WHO) came together with the United Nations Children's Fund (UNICEF), United Nations System Influenza Coordination, and the World Bank to develop a framework entitled Contributing to One World, One Health-A Strategic Framework for Reducing Risks of Infectious Diseases at the Animal-Human-Ecosystems Interface in 2008, reiterating recommendations for a One Health approach to global health. This framework was expanded and implementable policies were developed at Stone Mountain, Georgia in May 2010. International meetings on One Health were held in 2011 in Africa and Australia.

In 2012, Barbara Natterson-Horowitz, a physician, and Kathryn Bowers, a science journalist, published the book Zoobiquity, coining the term as they drew parallels between animal and human health through vivid case studies. They called for the biomedical scientific and clinical communities to rediscover comparative medicine and reexamine human and animal health in terms of evolution and the environment. A New York Times bestseller, the book has been described as "easy to read and entertaining" in its presentation of ideas similar to the "One Health" concept, but also criticized as lacking depth and failing to recognize the extent to which animals and humans have differently evolved as complex systems.

In 2016, The One Health Commission, One Health Platform, and One Health Initiative Team deemed International One Health Day to be November 3.

In 2019, Senator Tina Smith and Representative Kurt Schrader introduced the Advancing Emergency Preparedness Through One Health Act into the United States Senate and House of Representatives, respectively. This bi-partisan piece of legislation would require that the Department of Health and Human Services, Department of Agriculture, and other federal agencies develop a coordinated plan to create a One Health Framework to help prepare responses to zoonotic disease and prevent disease outbreaks. The bill was re-introduced by Tina Smith and Todd Young on March 18, 2021.

== Public health applications ==
The One Health model is commonly applied to public health problems that involve interactions among humans, animals, and the environment. These applications include zoonotic disease prevention, food safety, antimicrobial resistance surveillance, and environmental health interventions. Reviews of the One Health literature have identified zoonoses, environmental health, agriculture, food safety, and global health as recurring areas of application. The approach is used to encourage coordination across sectors because many infectious disease threats are shaped by animal reservoirs, ecological conditions, and human activity at the same time.

== Habitat Fragmentation and The One Health Framework ==
Habitat Fragmentation is a process where a once continuous habitat is broken into smaller and isolated patches. Activities such as deforestation, agriculture, urbanization, and natural disturbances can significantly shrink landscapes, and as a result these changes force wildlife and humans to come closer in contact. This increases the spread of zoonotic diseases between organisms as it makes them share the environment along with the resources in it. Due to the inability to access resources, stress increases among animals which weakens their immune systems. Due to higher stress levels the overall health declines, further increasing the chances that wildlife shed and change the distribution of pathogens across the ecosystem.

=== Nipah Virus ===
Nipah virus is a disease that targets in respiratory illness and encephalitis in humans. It results due to an infection which is carried by fruit bats and can be transmitted to humans through contact with infected animals, contaminated food, or close contact with an infected person. A significant cause of the Nipah virus infection is due to deforestation and fragmentation. Flowering and fruiting trees were destroyed through the removal of trees which reduced food resources available for fruit bats. Consequently, this forced them to move closer to orchards and areas where sap was collected, putting them into closer contact with humans and livestock, thus increasing opportunities for the virus to spread.

== Leading and supporting organizations ==
=== One Health Commission (OHC) ===
In 2007, Roger K. Mahr from the American Veterinary Medical Association, Jay H. Glasser from the American Public Health Association, and Ronald M. Davis from the American Medical Association came together as liaisons with other health science professionals, academics, students, government workers, and industry scientists to create a task force and have teleconferences to discuss One Health. This One Health Initiative Task Force created a report in 2008 which outlined recommendations to:

- Create a joint steering committee,
- Implement improved communications efforts,
- Plan national One Health studies,
- Develop a One Health Commission,
- Create advisory teams,
- Establish national meetings,
- and engage medical, veterinary, and public health students.

The One Health Commission (OHC) was chartered in Washington, D.C. in 2009 as a 501(c)3 non-profit organization. Its mission is to connect individuals and create relationships across human, animal, and environmental health sectors, as well as to educate the public about these issues with the intent to improve global health. Roger Mahr was the founding CEO. A request for proposal for an institutional partner was put forth in 2010, and Iowa State University was selected to be the main site for operations. In 2013, Roger Mahr retired from the commission and the operations site moved to the Research Triangle of North Carolina, where it currently resides. The current executive director is Cheryl Stroud, a veterinarian, who has held the position since 2013.

The One Health Commission began in 2014 compiling a Who's Who in One Health, a Directory of organizations around the world that are actively working to further the One Health paradigm shift. The OHC also oversees a Global One Health Community listserv. In addition the commission has a webpage known as the One Health Library with many types of resources available on the topic of or connected to One Health.

=== One Health Initiative ===
The One Health Initiative is an interdisciplinary movement to create collaborations between animal, human, and environmental health organizations including the American Veterinary Medical Association, American Medical Association, Centers for Disease Control and Prevention, United States Department of Agriculture, Vétérinaires sans Frontières/ Tierärzte ohne Grenzen and the United States National Environmental Health Association, among others. Such collaboration, which often remains very limited, could lead to more quick and profound exchange of knowledge and insights between disciplines and professionals, which is important to better and more rapidly respond to outbreaks and newly emerging zoonoses and diseases.

=== One Health Platform ===
The One Health Platform is a scientific reference network to unite researchers and experts to better understand and prepare for zoonotic disease outbreaks from animals to humans, and antimicrobial resistance, including a better understanding of environmental factors that impact disease dynamics. The management board is made up of Ab Osterhaus, John Mackenzie, and Chris Vanlangendonck.

The organization has nine objectives, which include:

- Disseminating research results at biennial meetings,
- Identifying knowledge gaps in the field,
- Engaging policy makers,
- Establishing a Bio Threats Scanning Group to connect One Health and global health security,
- Share data,
- Serve as a reference network to the government,
- Foster collaborations,
- Implement policies,
- and increase awareness during One Health Day.

The One Health Platform was responsible for organizing the World One Health Congress meeting each year 2015 - 2020. The next World One Health Congress scheduled for 2022 continued in Singapore hosted by SingHealth Duke-NUS Global Health Institute.

=== The FAO-WOAH-WHO Collaboration ===
FAO works closely with WOAH (formerly OIE) and WHO, referred to all together as the Tripartite organizations. WHO was a partner in the 2008 establishment of a strategic One Health framework for approaching global health problems. In September 2017, a feature page for One Health was included on the WHO website, defining One Health and highlighting important topic areas such as food safety, zoonotic disease, and antimicrobial resistance. WOAH (headquartered in Paris, France) was also a partner in establishing a strategic One Health framework in 2008. WOAH works to maintain transparency surrounding global animal disease, collect and distribute veterinary information, publish international trade standards for animals/ animal products, improve veterinary services globally, and to promote animal welfare and food safety.

FAO put forth in 2011 a strategic action plan for One Health, which had the objective to strengthen food security by improving animal production systems and veterinary services and called for action in improving collaborations between animal, human, and environmental health sectors. FAO, WOAH and WHO published a new guide to approaching zoonotic disease with a One Health framework in 2019.

In February 2021, acknowledging the importance of the environment for the One Health approach, the three partner organizations invited UNEP to join the Tripartite. In March of the same year, the Tripartite and UNEP agreed to work together on a strategy to apply the One Health approach in the prevention of future pandemics. One year later, in March 2022, the Twenty-eighth Tripartite Annual Executive Meeting saw the signing of a memorandum of understanding by all organizations involved to mark the change from a Tripartite to a Quadripartite partnership.

==== One health joint plan of action (2022‒2026) ====
This Quadripartite partnership was not simply adding a new team member to a coalition. On October 2022, the Quadripartite partnership resulted in the development of the One Health Joint Plan of Action. This give-year framework was developed to shift threat response from a focus on mitigation and reactivity to one of prevention through the consideration of the human, health animal health, and environmental health. This plan is organized into six specific action tracks:

1. Enhancing One Health Capacities to Strengthen Health Systems:
  - Provide adequate guidance and tools for the effective implementation of multisectoral approaches to promote the health of humans, animals, plants and ecosystems and to prevent and manage risks at the human–animal–plant–environment interface.
2. Reducing risks from emerging and re-emerging zoonotic epidemics and pandemics
  - Reduce the risk and minimize the local and global impacts of zoonotic epidemics and pandemics by understanding the linkages and drivers of emergence and spillover, adopting upstream prevention measures and strengthening One Health surveillance, early warning and response systems.
3. Controlling and eliminating endemic zoonotic diseases, neglected tropical diseases and vector-borne diseases
  - Reduce the burden of endemic zoonotic, neglected tropical and vector-borne diseases by supporting countries in implementing community-centric, risk-based solutions, strengthening policy and legal frameworks from the local to the global level and across sectors, and increasing political commitment and investment.
4. Strengthening the assessment, management, and communication of food safety risks
  - Promote awareness, policy changes and action coordination among stakeholders to ensure that humans, animals and ecosystems achieve health and remain healthy in their interactions with and along the food supply chain.
5. Curbing the silent pandemic of antimicrobial resistance
  - Take joint action to preserve antimicrobial efficacy and ensure sustainable and equitable access to antimicrobials for responsible and prudent use in human, animal and plant health
6. Integrating the environment into One Health
  - Protect and restore biodiversity, prevent the degradation of ecosystems and the wider environment to jointly support the health of people, animals, plants and ecosystems, underpinning sustainable development.

=== CDC One Health Office ===
The Centers for Disease Control and Prevention (CDC), created a One Health Office in 2009, becoming the first United States federal agency to have an office dedicated to this field. This office works alongside other animal, human, and environmental health organizations both within the United States and across the world in order to increase the awareness of One Health and develop tools to help strengthen One Health movements. The CDC One Health Office is involved in multiple initiatives, including working to implement a Zoonotic Disease Prioritization process, creating Global Health Security Agenda Action Packages, overseeing the Zoonoses Education Coalition, developing guidelines with the National Association of State Public Health Veterinarians, and helping educate youth involved with agriculture about influenza. Additionally, the CDC One Health Office hosts webinars to educate audiences about One Health issues such as food safety, antimicrobial resistance, and recent disease outbreaks.

The One Health Zoonotic Disease Prioritization process is led by the CDC. It involves holding workshops internationally to prioritize which zoonotic diseases are of the most concern and helping countries develop action plans to address those diseases. The process involves 3-6 facilitators representing human, animal, and environmental health sectors, up to 12 voting members which represent human health/public health, agriculture/livestock, wildlife/fisheries, the environment and other relevant government sectors, and 10-15 advisors from international organizations (such as the WHO, FAO or OIE), academic partners or NGOs not directly involved in zoonotic diseases. The CDC One Health Office trains facilitators and it takes months to prepare for a workshop to acquire the necessary resources, identify participants, review zoonotic information and confirm logistics. Completed workshops have been held in a variety of countries including Pakistan, Tanzania, Thailand, Uzbekistan and China. Diseases most commonly prioritized include rabies, brucellosis, influenza, Ebola virus, and Rift Valley fever.

== Antimicrobial resistance ==
Antimicrobial resistance (AMR) is widely recognized as a major global public health threat and is commonly addressed through a One Health framework, as resistant microorganisms and antimicrobial residues can circulate among humans, animals, plants, and the environment. The Centers for Disease Control and Prevention identifies antimicrobial resistance as a One Health issue affecting people, animals, and ecosystems, emphasizing the interconnected nature of resistance across sectors.

A One Health perspective highlights that antimicrobial resistance does not arise solely in clinical settings. The use and misuse of antimicrobials in human medicine, veterinary care, and agriculture contribute to the selection of resistant organisms, while environmental pathways such as wastewater, soil, and agricultural runoff facilitate their spread. Research has demonstrated that resistant bacteria and resistance genes can transfer between human, animal, and environmental systems, reinforcing the need for integrated surveillance and coordinated intervention strategies.

International policy frameworks have increasingly incorporated antimicrobial resistance into One Health strategies. The Quadripartite One Health Joint Plan of Action (2022–2026) identifies antimicrobial resistance as a key priority requiring coordinated action across human, animal, and environmental health sectors. The United Nations Environment Programme has also highlighted the role of environmental contamination in the emergence and spread of resistance, supporting calls for strengthened antimicrobial stewardship, infection prevention, and environmental risk mitigation.

== Surveillance systems ==
One Health surveillance systems are integrated frameworks designed to systematically monitor, detect, and respond to health threats arising at the intersection of human, animal, and environmental health. Grounded in the One Health concept, these surveillance systems enable early identification of zoonotic diseases, antimicrobial resistance, food safety issues, and environmental hazards by consolidating data from multiple sectors, including human healthcare, veterinary medicine, agriculture, wildlife, and ecological studies.

Notable examples of One Health surveillance include global initiatives such as the USAID-funded PREDICT project, which identifies and tracks emerging zoonotic pathogens across different regions of the world, and the Tripartite Zoonosis Guide developed collaboratively by the World Health Organization (WHO), Food and Agriculture Organization (FAO), and the World Organization for Animal Health (WOAH) to support integrated surveillance and risk assessment efforts.

Despite their effectiveness, One Health surveillance systems face implementation challenges, including difficulties with cross-sectoral data sharing, limited communication and coordination across disciplines, and resource constraints. Nevertheless, global health organizations widely recognize these systems as essential to enhancing global preparedness for pandemics and addressing complex health challenges related to environmental and socio-economic changes.

== See also ==
- Conservation medicine
- Parasparopagraho Jivanam
- EcoHealth
- Environmental health
- Planetary health
