= Planetary health =

Health of civilization and natural systems

Planetary Health refers to the interdependence of human and environmental health. It is an interdisciplinary research field and global movement that explores the consequences of environmental change on human health. Planetary health refers to "the health of human civilization and the state of the natural systems on which it depends." In 2015, the Rockefeller Foundation–Lancet Commission on Planetary Health launched the concept which is currently being developed towards a new health science with over 25 areas of expertise.

== Background and milestones ==
There are a number of ideas and concepts that can be understood as precursors to the concept of planetary health. According to Susan Prescott, the term "planetary health" emerged from the environmental and holistic health movements of the 1970-80s. In 1980, Friends of the Earth expanded the World Health Organization's definition of health, stating, "health is a state of complete physical, mental, social and ecological well-being and not merely the absence of disease - personal health involves planetary health." James Lovelock created the term "Planetary Medicine" in 1986. In 1993 the Norwegian physician Per Fugelli wrote: "The patient Earth is sick. Global environmental disruptions can have serious consequences for human health. It's time for doctors to give a world diagnosis and advise on treatment." In the 1990s, a model curriculum Terra Medicine (Planetary Medicine) was developed at the Catholic University of Eichstätt-Ingolstadt as part of the Altmühltal Agenda 21 project. In 2000, James Lovelock published his book Gaia: The Practical Science of Planetary Medicine.

=== Milestones ===
In March 2014 an issue of the medical journal The Lancet called for a movement for planetary health to transform the field of public health, which has traditionally focused on the health of human populations without necessarily considering the surrounding natural ecosystems. The proposal recognized the emerging threats to natural and human-made systems that support humanity.

In 2015, the Rockefeller Foundation and The Lancet launched the Rockefeller Foundation–Lancet Commission on Planetary Health. The Planetary Health Alliance was founded in December 2015, by Harvard University, together with the Wildlife Conservation Society and other partner organizations. The Rockefeller Foundation Economic Council on Planetary Health at the Oxford Martin School was established on 1 June 2017 to further define the new discipline of planetary health. The open-access journal Lancet Planetary Health published its inaugural issue in April 2017.

The São Paulo Declaration on Planetary Health is a multi-stakeholder call to action co-created by the global Planetary Health community at the 2021 Planetary Health Annual Meeting in São Paulo, Brazil. The declaration calls on governments, the private sector, civil society, and the general public to commit to the Great Transition to safeguard a healthy and equitable future for humanity and protect all life on Earth.

In 2022, on the occasion of the 50th anniversary of the first UN environmental conference "United Nations Conference on the Human Environment" in Stockholm 1972, the UN published the report: 'UN Conference Stockholm+50: A Healthy Planet for the Prosperity of All - Our Responsibility, Our Opportunity'.

In 2023 the Association of Faculties of Medicine of Canada published the "Academic Health Institutions' Declaration on Planetary Health," which calls on all academic health institutions throughout the world to take immediate action to halt both the negative impact of their activities on the planet's natural systems, and to institute adaptive and regenerative measures, including through advocacy. More than 40 academic health institutions have signed the declaration. These include medical schools, faculties of medicine, schools of nursing, schools of public health, and other health-related academic institutions from various countries including Canada, India, Finland, Dominican Republic, South Africa, Germany, Portugal, Indonesia, and others.

The Royal Netherlands Academy of Arts and Sciences published a comprehensive report in June 2023 on the state of planetary health research and the future research agenda, which has relevance not only for the Netherlands but also internationally (Planetary Health Advisory Report).

In April 2024, the Global Planetary Health Roadmap and Action Plan, a map to guide a path forward for Planetary Health was created by over 100 members of a worldwide community, building on the principles and call to action of the 2021 São Paulo Declaration on Planetary Health. The roadmap encompasses key domains, such as governance, education, business, and communications, providing a strategic framework to nurture this growing movement and safeguard the health and well-being of all life on Earth.

== Research paradigms and agenda ==
Drawing from the definition of health – "a state of complete physical, mental and social wellbeing and not merely the absence of disease or infirmity" – as well as principles articulated in the preamble of the constitution of the World Health Organization, The Lancet Commission report elaborated that planetary health refers to the "achievement of the highest attainable standard of health, wellbeing, and equity worldwide through judicious attention to the human systems – political, economic, and social – that shape the future of humanity and the Earth's natural systems that define the safe environmental limits within which humanity can flourish."

The report laid down the overarching principles guiding the idea of planetary health. One is that human health depends on "flourishing natural systems and the wise stewardship of those natural systems". Human activities, such as energy generation and food production, have led to substantial global effects on the Earth's systems, prompting scientists to refer to the modern times as the Anthropocene.

The Planetary Health Education Framework, developed in 2021 by the Planetary Health Alliance, aims to guide the education of global citizens, practitioners, and professionals able and willing to address complex planetary health challenges. The framework also seeks to inspire all peoples across the globe to create, restore, steward, and conserve healthy ecosystems for a thriving human civilization. The framework considers five foundational domains that form the essence of Planetary Health knowledge, values, and practice: (1) interconnection with nature, (2) the Anthropocene and health, (3) equity and social justice, (4) movement building and systems change, and (5) systems thinking and complexity.

A group of Earth system and environmental scientists led by Johan Rockström from the Stockholm Resilience Centre proposed the concept of nine planetary boundaries within which humanity can continue to develop and thrive for generations to come. According to a 2024 update, six of the planetary boundaries – climate change, biosphere integrity, biogeochemical flows, land-system change, freshwater use, and novel entities-had already been exceeded. A seventh boundary, ocean acidification is approaching its threshold.

The Rockefeller Foundation–Lancet Commission on Planetary Health report concluded that urgent and transformative actions are needed to protect present and future generations. One important area which required immediate attention was the system of governance and organization of human knowledge, which was deemed inadequate to address the threats to planetary health.

The report made several overarching recommendations. One was to improve governance to aid the integration of social, economic, and environmental policies and for the creation, synthesis, and application of interdisciplinary knowledge. The authors called for solutions based on the redefinition of prosperity to focus on the enhancement of quality of life and delivery of improved health for all, together with respect for the integrity of natural systems.

=== International research agenda for planetary health ===
In June 2023, the Royal Netherlands Academy of Sciences presented their planetary health report Planetary Health, An emerging field to be developed based on a two-year consultative process. Many knowledge gaps were identified in the field of planetary health. A review of the literature and subsequent consultation with experts resulted in a longlist of more than one hundred specific knowledge gaps. Knowledge for the health impacts of global environmental change on human health are incomplete, pathways are poorly understood, the effectiveness of mitigation and adaptation measures are still unclear, how timely policy and behaviour change can be realised. The Academy concluded that: "Filling all planetary health knowledge gaps requires an international collaborative effort in research funding". The Academy will cooperate with international partner and 'umbrella academies' (such as EASAC, FEAM and ALLEA) to take this agenda forward.

In 2025 the United Nations Environment Programme (UNEP) report GEO-7 found that investing in planetary health can deliver trillions in additional global GDP, avoid millions of deaths and reduce poverty and hunger. Nutrition and diet are important contributors to and indicators of planetary health. Diets, agriculture, and technology must adjust to sustain population projections upwards of 9 billion while reducing harmful consequences on the environment through food waste and carbon-intensive diets. A focus of planetary health research is nutritional solutions that are sustainable for the human species and the environment, and the generation of scientific research and political will to create and implement desired solutions. In January 2019, an international commission created the planetary health diet.

Planetary health aims to seek out further solutions to global human and environmental sustainability through collaboration and research across all sectors, including the economy, energy, agriculture, water, and health. Biodiversity loss, exposure to pollutants, climate change, and fuel consumption are all issues that threaten human and health, and are, as such, foci of the field. A number of researchers think that it is actually humanity's destruction of biodiversity and the invasion of wild landscapes that creates the conditions for malaria, and new diseases such as COVID-19. Some propose incorporating concern for the impact of digital technology in planetary health and health promotion, including the impact of generative AI on climate, biodiversity, and pollution.

== Planetary Health Alliance ==
The Planetary Health Alliance is an informal global consortium of over 580 universities, non-governmental organizations, government entities, and research institutes with over 24,000 newsletter subscribers.

Several PHA regional hubs function as locally rooted communities that bring PHA members together in geographic clusters to collaboratively advance planetary health research, education, policy, and outreach relevant to specific local contexts.

The alliance's mission is "to promote, mobilize, and lead an inclusive, transdisciplinary field of Planetary Health and its diverse science, stories, solutions, and communities to achieve a comprehensive shift in how human beings interact with each other and Nature, in order to secure a livable future for humanity and the rest of life on Earth." Since November 2023, the secretariat of PHA is based at Johns Hopkins University alongside the Johns Hopkins Institute for Planetary Health.

=== Regional Hubs ===
There are eight established Planetary Health Regional Hubs that function as locally rooted communities which bring PHA members together in geographic clusters to collaboratively advance planetary health research, education, policy, and outreach relevant to specific local contexts

While additional hubs are under development, the eight established Planetary Health Regional Hubs are:

- Caribbean
- East Africa
- Europe
- Japan
- Latin America
- Oceania
- South & Southeast Asia
- West Africa

In 2022, the inaugural Planetary Health Europe Regional Hub meeting was held in Amsterdam, with 72 institutions represented. The inaugural meeting was organized by the Planetary Health Alliance, the European Environment and Sustainable Development Advisory Councils Network (EEAC Network), and Natura Artis Magistra (ARTIS). The PHA Europe Secretariat has been located in the Netherlands. It is jointly coordinated by Maastricht University and the University Medical Center Utrecht (UMC Utrecht).

=== Next Generation Network ===
The Planetary Health Next Generation Network is composed of students and next-generation leaders worldwide who are dedicated to advancing the emerging field of Planetary Health through local community efforts, educational events, and research projects. This open-access network brings together the Planetary Health Campus Ambassadors (PHCAs), Planetary Health student club leaders and members, former and current Travel Scholars to Planetary Health Annual Meetings, and any youths who would like to engage with the Planetary Health community. The Planetary Health Alliance staff team and Impact Fellows work to support these diverse efforts by providing introductory resources, workshop materials, mentorship opportunities, and community-building platforms.

=== Campus Ambassador program ===
The Planetary Health Campus Ambassador program formally recognizes next-generation leaders in planetary health on academic campuses and within the international planetary health community at-large. During the program, ambassadors build their planetary health network and gain leadership and organizational skills with the support of their program cohort, staff, fellows, and alliance members. Ambassadors are empowered to take leadership on their campus and beyond, to educate their community, and to facilitate collaborations between existing disciplines and initiatives within the scope of human health and environmental change. They also become part of the program's broader Next Generation Network, composed of individuals from a variety of academic and cultural backgrounds, career stages, and interests. They also have access to leadership opportunities within other initiatives, such as the global Planetary Health Annual Meeting, Planetary Health Regional Hubs, Clinicians for Planetary Health, and various education projects.

=== Annual meeting ===
The Planetary Health Annual Meeting, convened by the Planetary Health Alliance, is an international conference series established in 2017, serving as a global forum for advancing the field of Planetary Health. First launched at Harvard University, these meetings have evolved into comprehensive gatherings connecting diverse stakeholders including scientists, policymakers, healthcare professionals, educators, students, and community leaders from over 130 countries. The meetings rotate globally, having been hosted in the United States (Harvard University 2017, 2022; Stanford University 2019), Scotland (University of Edinburgh 2018), Brazil (University of São Paulo 2021, virtual), and Malaysia (Sunway University 2024), reflecting a commitment to geographic and cultural diversity in addressing planetary health challenges. A meeting is planned for October 2025 in the Netherlands (Erasmus University).

The meetings consistently focus on planetary health themes, including climate change, biodiversity loss, food systems transformation, health equity, and education. Each meeting has produced significant outcomes that have shaped the field: from establishing foundational frameworks in the early meetings to the São Paulo Declaration on Planetary Health (2021) and the Kuala Lumpur Call to Action (2024), accompanied by the launch of the global Planetary Health Roadmap and Action Plan. Through plenary sessions, research presentations, workshops, and community engagement activities, these meetings have been instrumental in building capacity, fostering collaboration, and driving actionable solutions for planetary health challenges.

== Comparison with other fields ==
Comparison of integrated approach in health
	Origins	Concept
Environmental health	From the 1880s Sanitary Science	Anthropocentric approach on environment influence on human health.
One Health (legacy)	Virchow and Osler (1800s) and Schwabe (1964) zoonosis	Collaboration of human medicine and veterinary.
One Medicine–One Health (modern)	Early 2000s as response to emerging infectious diseases (SARS, MERS, Ebola)	Cross-sectoral and transdisciplinary collaboration to improve health of humans, animals and ecosystems because of inter-connectedness.; Recognizes the interconnectedness of human, animal, and environmental health.; Incorporates components of food safety, antimicrobial resistance, and environmental contaminations.
Conservation medicine	1990s as health gains importance in conservation	Connection of health of animals and humans and ecosystems in situ
Comparative medicine	Since ancient time	Understanding shared or similar pathophysiological processes, which is fundamentals for medical and translational research
Ecohealth	1990s by French Canadian-based International Development Research Centre	Dependency of human and animal health and wellbeing on sustained environment.; Human and ecosystem health exists in socio-ecological interactions
Planetary health	Introduced in 1970–80s, and repopularized by Lancet Commission and Rockefeller Foundation	Anthropomorphized view of impact and interconnectedness of humans with the Earth at all levels
One Welfare	Emerged in 2015 for promotion of the links between animal welfare and human wellbeing	Highlights the interconnection of animal welfare, human wellbeing, and environment to foster interdisciplinary collaboration in order to improve human and animal welfare
Beyond One Ocean Health (B1OH)	Impacts of environmental change on health of ecosystems and organisms with emphasis on ocean	Highlights transdisciplinary actions on aquatic ecosystems, interconnected integrated systems and health through sustainable developments; Links healthy ocean with health and equity.
Public health		Population-based (instead of individual); Focus on health promotion and prevention (instead of treatment and rehabilitation); Social, cultural, economic, political, and environmental determinant of health
Global health	Supraterritoriality of health	Transboundary health threats

Planetary health relates to a range of other fields and paradigms such as public health, environmental health, ecohealth, One Health, conservation medicine and international health. It is also influenced by traditional and contemporary Indigenous knowledge systems from around the world.

While there may be competing definitions of global health, it is loosely defined as the health of populations in a global context, a response to the cross-border movement of health drivers as well as risks, and an improvement over the older concept of international health with its new emphasis on achieving equity in health among all people. Some scholars hold that advocacy of planetary health amounts to an over-expansion and totalization of health.

The editor in chief of The Lancet, Richard Horton, wrote in a 2014 special issue of The Economist on planetary health, that global health was no longer able to truly meet the demands which societies face, as it was still too narrow to explain and illuminate some pressing challenges. "Global health does not fully take into account the natural foundation on which humans live – the planet itself. Nor does it factor in the force and fragility of human civilizations." In 2015, Judith Rodin, president of the Rockefeller Foundation, declared planetary health as a new discipline in global health.

In September 2024, the Consortium of Universities for Global Health (CUGH) put forth a set of planetary health learning objectives, noting "the knowledge of planetary health science, interventions, and communication that is essential for future global health professionals." CUGH included planetary health in the updated edition of their Global Health Competencies Toolkit.

In 2023, the US Bureau of Labor Statistics updated the definition of environmental engineering as using, "engineering disciplines in developing solutions to problems of planetary health." In 2026, Daniel Oerther proposed that the profession of engineering modify the paramountcy clause to, "hold paramount the health, safety, and welfare of the public and the planet," in recognition of the interconnectedness of all life.

== See also ==
- Planetary diet
- Planetary integrity
- Planetary management
- Gaia hypothesis
