= The Rockefeller Foundation Economic Council on Planetary Health =

The Rockefeller Foundation Economic Council on Planetary Health at the Oxford Martin School was established on 1 June 2017 to further define the new discipline of planetary health. Its mandate is to explore the economic link between human health and the earth's natural systems on which health depends. By the end of 2019, it must recommend actionable public policy on this link.

The council, made up of world leaders from government, international organizations, civil society, business, finance and academia, will meet several times throughout the 18 months of its mandate to develop specific recommendations and a decision-making framework that balances economic development with ecosystem protection, while promoting human health and well-being.

The council is hosted at the Oxford Martin School at the University of Oxford.

== Background ==
The Rockefeller Foundation is a private foundation, with a stated mission of "promoting the well-being of humanity throughout the world." The Oxford Martin School is a research and policy unit based in the Social Sciences Division of the University of Oxford. Together, they have joined forces to build the new and emerging field of planetary health. Planetary health examines "the relationship between human health and the natural systems on which it depends."

The scientific case for a planetary health approach was established in a July 2015 report in The Lancet, “Safeguarding human health in the Anthropocene epoch,” wherein the Rockefeller Foundation-Lancet Commission on planetary health detailed the ways in which the degradation of natural systems harms the health of individuals, families and communities around the world. The report made several recommendations for how to do this, including having integrated social, economic and environmental policies, and better governance.

The role of the Economic Council on Planetary Health will be to provide advice and recommendations for how to reach these goals. The council will meet several times a year to explore the economic link between human health and environmental change; increase existing scientific planetary health evidence by providing leaders and policy-makers with economic data for protecting human health through the preservation of the earth's natural systems; and recommend the necessary economic policy reforms.

By the end of 2019, the council is expected to produce a report that will recommend actionable public policy for governments and institutions on advancing planetary health.

The Rockefeller Foundation will provide $15 million toward establishing the pillars of a new planetary health discipline. Other organizations are also contributing to the emerging field, including the Planetary Health Alliance (PHA).

== Council members ==
The chair of The Rockefeller Foundation Economic Council on Planetary Health is Ernesto Zedillo, former president of Mexico and current director of the Yale Center for the Study of Globalization.

Other members include:

- Scott Barrett, Lenfest-Earth Institute Professor of Natural Resource Economics, Columbia University's School of International and Public Affairs
- Gro Harlem Brundtland, former prime minister of Norway and director-general of the WHO
- Luisa Diogo, former prime minister of Mozambique
- Christiana Figueres, former executive secretary of the UNFCCC
- Andy Haines, former director, London School of Hygiene and Tropical Medicine; chair of The Rockefeller Foundation-Lancet Commission on Planetary Health
- Jacob Lew, former U.S. Treasury Secretary
- Carlos Nobre, former secretary of R&D policies at the Ministry of Science, Technology and Innovation of Brazil
- Nicholas Stern, IG Patel Professor of Economics and Government, London School of Economics
- Mark Tercek, president and CEO, The Nature Conservancy
- Richard Branson, founder, Virgin Group
- Razan Khalifa Al Mubarak, secretary general, Environment Agency – Abu Dhabi
- Dabo Guan, professor in climate change economics, School of International Development, University of East Anglia
- Naina Lal Kidwai, chair of the Sustainability, Energy & Water Council, past president of Federation of Indian Chambers of Commerce and Industry
- Paul Polman, CEO, Unilever

The council members are supported by an international secretariat consisting of:

- Sarah Whitmee, executive secretary
- Michael Grubb, chief policy analyst
- Lucien Georgeson, policy advisor
- Ian Bateman, environmental and economic analysis expert
- Mark Schulman, communications specialist
