= Conservation medicine =

Interdisciplinary field

Disability-adjusted life years lost due to malaria per 100,000 inhabitants in 2002. no data ≤10 10-50 50-100 100-250 250-500 500-1000 1000-1500 1500-2000 2000-2500 2500-3000 3000-3500 ≥3500

Conservation medicine is an emerging, interdisciplinary field that studies the relationship between human and non-human animal health and environmental conditions. Specifically, conservation medicine is the study of how the health of humans, animals, and the environment are interconnected and affected by conservation issues. It is also known as planetary health, environmental medicine, medical geology, or ecological medicine.

The environmental causes of health problems are complex, global, and poorly understood. Conservation medicine practitioners form multidisciplinary teams to tackle these issues. Teams may involve physicians and veterinarians working alongside researchers and clinicians from diverse disciplines, including microbiologists, pathologists, landscape analysts, marine biologists, toxicologists, epidemiologists, climate biologists, anthropologists, economists, and political scientists.

== Prevalence ==
A physician in the 1800s, Rudolf Virchow, once said "between animal and human medicine, there is no dividing line- nor should there be". The intersection of the health of animals, humans, and their environment has been an area of discussion since then. The term conservation medicine was first described in the 1990s with the recognition of the impact human population, environmental degradation, illegal hunting, and biodiversity loss contributed to the health of wildlife populations in Africa. The increasing interest in conservation medicine since then represents a significant development in both medicine and environmentalism.

While the initial discovery of conservation medicine focused on health of wildlife populations, it became apparent that human health is also impacted by animals and the environment as humans became more aware of zoonotic diseases. Diseases that spread between animals and humans such as certain strains of the flu, salmonellosis, West Nile virus, the plague, coronaviruses (severe acute respiratory syndrome (SARS) and Middle East respiratory syndrome (MERS)), rabies, brucellosis, malaria, HIV, avian influenza, Lyme disease, Nipah virus, and other emerging infectious diseases are among the few human diseases known to be connected to the environment or animal health. As of 2023, up to 70% of emerging infectious diseases (EID) originate from animals, which has brought the concept of conservation medicine to the forefront of current ideas in healthcare.

While the hands-on process of conservation medicine in individual cases is complicated, the underlying concept is quite intuitive, namely, that human health, wildlife health, and ecosystem health are all related. The threat of zoonotic diseases that travel to humans from animals is central. For example, burning huge areas of forest to make way for farmland may displace a wild animal species, which then infects a domesticated animal. The domesticated animal then enters the human food chain and infects people, and a new health threat emerges. Conventional approaches to the environment, animal and human health rarely examine these connections. In conservation medicine, such relationships are fundamental. Professionals from the many disciplines involved necessarily work closely together.

== History and One Health ==
Since the emergence of the idea of conservation medicine, many human physicians and veterinarians have adopted the initiative titled One Health. One Health evolved from the early idea of One Medicine, which was developed by veterinary communities as early as the 1900s. Originally, One Health solely promoted the interconnectedness of animal health and human health, and failed to recognize the role of the ecosystem's health in the health and wellbeing of animals and humans. However, One Health is now a recognized and valued approach to optimize the health of people, animals, and the environment, and has been adopted by a multitude of organizations and governing bodies to guide their work in protecting global health. The United States Centers for Disease Control and Prevention (CDC) and the United States National Institutes of Health (NIH) utilize the One Health approach to better understand and mitigate threats to human health. The World Organisation for Animal Health (WOAH) utilizes the One Health approach to improve animal health across the globe through advocacy and the spread of veterinary information. The United States Environmental Protection Agency (EPA) highlights their use of One Health to protect the environment stating "when we protect one, we protect all".

Comparison of integrated approach in health
	Origins	Concept
Environmental health	From the 1880s Sanitary Science	Anthropocentric approach on environment influence on human health.
One Health (legacy)	Virchow and Osler (1800s) and Schwabe (1964) zoonosis	Collaboration of human medicine and veterinary.
One Medicine–One Health (modern)	Early 2000s as response to emerging infectious diseases (SARS, MERS, Ebola)	Cross-sectoral and transdisciplinary collaboration to improve health of humans, animals and ecosystems because of inter-connectedness.; Recognizes the interconnectedness of human, animal, and environmental health.; Incorporates components of food safety, antimicrobial resistance, and environmental contaminations.
Conservation medicine	1990s as health gains importance in conservation	Connection of health of animals and humans and ecosystems in situ
Comparative medicine	Since ancient time	Understanding shared or similar pathophysiological processes, which is fundamentals for medical and translational research
Ecohealth	1990s by French Canadian-based International Development Research Centre	Dependency of human and animal health and wellbeing on sustained environment.; Human and ecosystem health exists in socio-ecological interactions
Planetary health	Introduced in 1970–80s, and repopularized by Lancet Commission and Rockefeller Foundation	Anthropomorphized view of impact and interconnectedness of humans with the Earth at all levels
One Welfare	Emerged in 2015 for promotion of the links between animal welfare and human wellbeing	Highlights the interconnection of animal welfare, human wellbeing, and environment to foster interdisciplinary collaboration in order to improve human and animal welfare
Beyond One Ocean Health (B1OH)	Impacts of environmental change on health of ecosystems and organisms with emphasis on ocean	Highlights transdisciplinary actions on aquatic ecosystems, interconnected integrated systems and health through sustainable developments; Links healthy ocean with health and equity.
Public health		Population-based (instead of individual); Focus on health promotion and prevention (instead of treatment and rehabilitation); Social, cultural, economic, political, and environmental determinant of health
Global health	Supraterritoriality of health	Transboundary health threats

The concept of conservation medicine utilizes a One Health approach, and specifically works to decrease disease and health risks humans and animals experience due to the degradation of the natural environment.

== Social impact ==
Looking at the environment and health together, conservation medicine has the potential to effect rapid change in public opinion on complex societal issues, by making the distant and ill-defined, local and pressing. For instance, global warming may vaguely define long-term impacts, but an immediate effect may be a relatively slight rise in air temperature. This in turn raises the flight ceiling for temperature-sensitive mosquitoes, allowing them to feed on higher flying migratory birds than usual, which in turn may carry a disease from one country or continent to another.

Likewise, the broad topic of suburban sprawl is made more relevant when seen in terms of the immediate imbalance it brings to rural ecosystems, which increases population densities and forces humans into closer contact with animals (like rodents), increasing the risk of new cross-species diseases. When tied to actual cases (such as SARS or HIV/AIDS), this holistic outlook resonates more powerfully with the public than more abstract explanations.

== See also ==
- One Health
- Zoonosis
- Tropical medicine
- Emergent virus
- Environmentalism
