= Barbara Natterson-Horowitz =

Cardiologist

- Born: Barbara Natterson
- Education: Harvard University; University of California, San Francisco
- Occupations: cardiologist, academic, author
- Website: bnatterson-horowitz.com

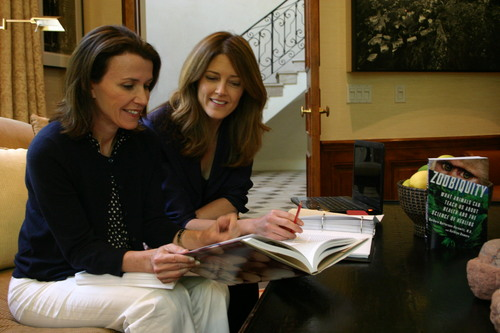
Barbara Natterson-Horowitz and Kathryn Bowers discuss their book, Zoobiquity.

Barbara N. Horowitz, M.D., (also known as Barbara Natterson-Horowitz) is a cardiologist, academic and author. Horowitz pioneered an approach to medical maladies, or a disease or disorder of the body, that focuses on animals being an insight for human health. She is a professor of medicine in the Division of Cardiology at University of California, Los Angeles (UCLA). Since 2020, Horowitz has served as a visiting professor in the Department of Human Evolutionary Biology at Harvard University. She serves as chair of the National Academies of Sciences, Engineering, and Medicines Board on Animal Health Sciences.

Horowitz is known for being a co-author of the 2013 New York Times bestseller Zoobiquity, co-authored with Kathryn Bowers, on the subject of a cross-species approach to medicine, which includes veterinary and evolutionary perspectives. In her book, she highlights the connections between the animal world and humans when dealing with medical maladies. In 2019, Horowitz and Bowers co-authored their second book, Wildhood, a story told about the real experiences of animal adolescents to better understand anxiety disorders to the origins of privilege.

== Education ==
Horowitz earned her Bachelor’s and master's degrees from Harvard University. She earned her medical degree from the University of California, San Francisco. She completed her internal medicine and psychiatry residencies at the UCLA, and served as chief resident in both departments. Her postgraduate training included a fellowship in cardiovascular medicine at UCLA from 1992-1995, in the Division of Cardiology, followed by advanced training in heart failure and cardiac imaging.

== Research ==
Horowitz practiced cardiology as an attending physician at UCLA Medical Center for more than twenty years, served as director of imaging at the UCLA Cardiac Arrhythmia Center, and instructor for multiple courses at the UCLA medical school. She has published papers on various issues like heart disease, cancer, mental illness and women's health. Horowitz studies cardiovascular adaptations of animals at the Los Angeles Zoo where she works as a cardiovascular consultant and Medical Advisory Board member.

For example, Horowitz had an interest in studying giraffes because of their height. She discovered they sustain high blood pressure while remaining healthy as a result of genetic adaptations related to cardiovascular development, fibrosis, blood pressure and circulation. She also used these principles to study high blood pressure during pregnancy.

She is also using the animal world to research methods to improve breast-feeding, postpartum depression, eating disorders, eye and heart health.

== Leadership and Advocacy ==
In 2011, Horowitz and Kathryn Bowers founded the Zoobiquity Conference to bring together leaders from human and animal medicine for collaborations to accelerate biomedical innovation to advance human and animal health. This conference was one of the first of its kind, and gathered 200 physicians and veterinarians to better understand the species-spanning nature of illness. There have been over 12 Zoobiquity Conferences held globally.

Horowitz is President of the International Society for Evolution, Medicine and Public Health (2019-2021), a member of the National Academies of Science, Engineering and Medicine’s ILAR, and Commissioner for the Lancet One Health Commission. She was a keynote speaker at the 2019 Nobel Conference on biomimicry in medicine in Stockholm, Sweden. Her talk centered around recognizing similarities between females in different species and how this could help overcome health challenges seen in women.

== Career ==
Since 2017, she has been a visiting professor in the Department of Human Evolutionary Biology at Harvard University. Since 2020, she has been on the faculty of Harvard Medical School. She is a Professor of Medicine in the Division of Cardiology at the David Geffen School of Medicine at UCLA, and a professor in the UCLA Department of Ecology and Evolutionary Biology.

Peter Lehmann reviewed her book Zoobiquity for readers in Germany, especially for psychiatric patients, and emphasized Horowitz's and Bowers’ reference to capture myopathy, which – according to the authors – may threaten agitated psychiatric patients in restraints in psychiatric wards, who can therefore die of heart failure, too.

In 2019, Scribner published Horowitz and Bowers’ second book, Wildhood, which received positive reception and reviews from the New York Times, Los Angeles Times, Chicago Tribune and other notable critics and media sources. The book synthesized the authors’ years-long research on thousands of wild species searching for evidence of human-like adolescence and makes the case that all adolescents face the same tests and challenges to grow successfully.

Natterson-Horowitz has also explored how giraffes can tolerate extremely high blood pressure without developing the same complications seen in humans. Her research looks at whether these adaptations could provide insights into conditions such as preeclampsia during pregnancy.

== Other publications ==
Horowitz publishes academic research in scientific journals such as Nature, Emerging Infectious Diseases, Echocardiography, The American Journal of Cardiology, Circulation.; and Proceedings of the National Academy of Sciences of the United States of America; and in media publications such as Newsweek, The New York Times, The Guardian, The Wall Street Journal, Scientific American, and New Scientist. Horowitz also published an article in 2020 called Humans aren’t the only ones that help out their adult kids — here’s why animals do it too Horowitz also co-published an article in 2017 titled Incorporating one health into medical education

== Personal life ==
Horowitz was raised in Los Angeles, California, by her parents, both of whom were psychotherapists. Horowitz is married and has two grown children.
