= Jennifer Shay =

Canadian academic and ecologist (1930–2018)

Jennifer Mary Shay OC
- Born: March 27, 1930; Hull, England
- Died: May 7, 2018 (aged 88); Yorkshire, England
- Education: University of London (B.S.); University of Manitoba (M.S., Ph.D.)
- Occupation(s): Academic and ecologist

Jennifer Mary Shay, OC (March 27, 1930 – May 7, 2018), was a Canadian academic and ecologist.

Born in Hull, England, the daughter of Frank and Kathleen Walker, she received a Bachelor of Science from the University of London in 1952. After moving to Canada in 1957, she completed her Master of Science in 1959 and her Doctor of Philosophy in Science in 1964 from the University of Manitoba. In 1965, she became an assistant professor, promoted to associate professor in 1967, and full professor in 1975. From 1966 to 1986, she was the founding director of the Delta Marsh Field Station, a research and teaching facility of the Faculty of Science located on the south shore of Lake Manitoba. She retired in 1993 and was appointed Professor Emerita of Botany in the Faculty of Science in 1995.

In 1988, she was made a Member of the Order of Canada and was promoted to Officer in 2000.

Jennifer Shay retired with her husband C. Thomas Shay to Yorkshire, England, in 2005. She died there in 2018 as a result of complications from Parkinson's disease.
