= Health ecology =

Study of human health and ecosystems

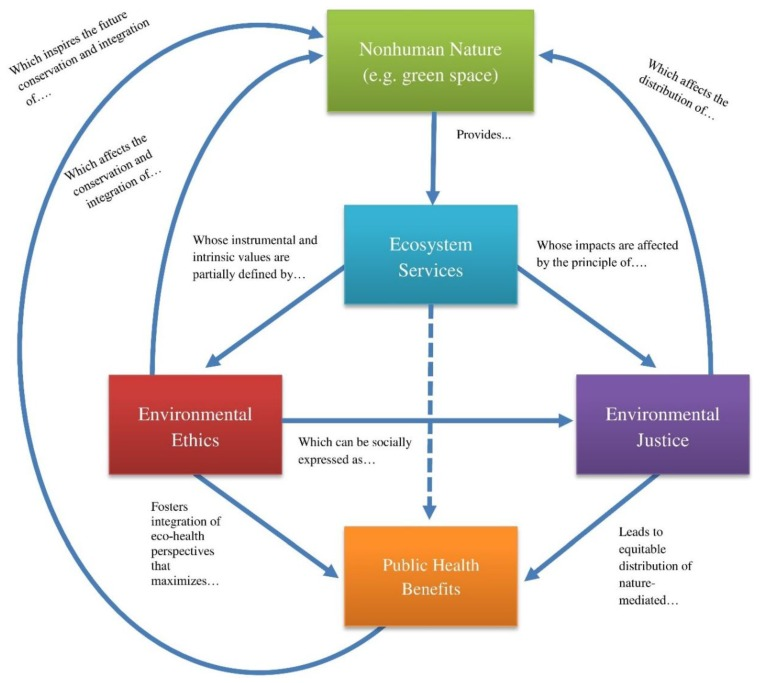
Conceptual map illustrating the connections among nonhuman nature, ecosystem services, environmental ethics, environmental justice, and public health.

Health ecology (also known as eco-health) is an emerging field that studies the impact of ecosystems on human health. It examines alterations in the biological, physical, social, and economic environments to understand how these changes affect mental and physical human health. Health ecology focuses on a trans-disciplinary approach to understanding all the factors which influence an individual's physiological, social, and emotional well-being.

Eco-health studies often involve environmental pollution. Some examples include an increase in asthma rates due to air pollution, or PCB contamination of game fish in the Great Lakes of the United States. However, health ecology is not tied to environmental pollution alone. For example, research has shown that habitat fragmentation is the main factor that contributes to increased rates of Lyme disease in human populations.

== History ==
Ecosystem approaches to public health emerged as a defined field of inquiry and application in the 1990s, primarily through global research supported by the International Development Research Centre (IDRC) in Ottawa, Canada. However, this was a resurrection of an approach to health and ecology traced back to Hippocrates in Western societies. However, it fell out of common practice in the twentieth century, when technical professionalism and expertise were assumed sufficient to manage health and disease. In this relatively brief era, evaluating the adverse impacts of environmental change (both the natural and artificial environment) on human health was assigned to medicine and environmental health.

Integrated approaches to health and ecology re-emerged in the 20th century. These revolutionary movements were built on a foundation laid by earlier scholars, including Hippocrates, Rudolf Virchow, and Louis Pasteur. In the 20th century, Calvin Schwabe coined the term "one medicine," recognising that human and veterinary medicine share similar biological principles, and are interrelated. This one medicine approach, which had fairly clinical and individualistic connotations, was rebranded to "One Health," to reflect its goals of global human and animal health. Other integrated health approaches include ecological resilience, ecological integrity, and healthy communities.

After a decade of international conferences in North America and Australia under the more contentious umbrella of "ecosystem health," the first "ecosystem approach to human health" (eco-health) forum was held in Montreal in 2003, followed by conferences and forums in Wisconsin, U.S., and Mérida, Mexico, all with major support from the IDRC. Since then, the International Association for Ecology and Health, and the journal Eco Health, have established the field as a legitimate scholarly and development activity.

== Definition ==
Eco-health studies differ from traditional, single-discipline studies, which focus on one aspect of a complex issue. A traditional epidemiological study may show increasing rates of malaria in a region, but not address the reasons for the increasing rate; an environmental health study may recommend the application of a pesticide in specific amounts in certain areas to reduce spread; an economic analysis may calculate the cost and effectiveness of such a program. Alternatively, an eco-health study combines multiple disciplines, and familiarizes the specialists with the affected community. Through pre-study meetings, the group shares their knowledge and develops common understanding. These pre-study meetings often lead to creative and novel approaches and can lead to a more "socially robust" solution. Eco-health practitioners term this synergy "trans-disciplinary" and differentiate it from multidisciplinary studies. Eco-health studies also value the participation of all active groups, including stakeholders and decision-makers. They believe issues of equity (between gender, socioeconomic classes, age, and even species) are essential to completely understand and solve the problem. Jean Lebel (2003) coined trans-disciplinary, participation, and equity as the three pillars of Eco Health. The IDRC now defines six principles instead of three pillars: trans-disciplinary, participation, gender and social equity, systems-thinking, sustainability, and research-to-action.

== Comparison with other fields ==
Comparison of integrated approach in health
	Origins	Concept
Environmental health	From the 1880s Sanitary Science	Anthropocentric approach on environment influence on human health.
One Health (legacy)	Virchow and Osler (1800s) and Schwabe (1964) zoonosis	Collaboration of human medicine and veterinary.
One Medicine–One Health (modern)	Early 2000s as response to emerging infectious diseases (SARS, MERS, Ebola)	Cross-sectoral and transdisciplinary collaboration to improve health of humans, animals and ecosystems because of inter-connectedness.; Recognizes the interconnectedness of human, animal, and environmental health.; Incorporates components of food safety, antimicrobial resistance, and environmental contaminations.
Conservation medicine	1990s as health gains importance in conservation	Connection of health of animals and humans and ecosystems in situ
Comparative medicine	Since ancient time	Understanding shared or similar pathophysiological processes, which is fundamentals for medical and translational research
Ecohealth	1990s by French Canadian-based International Development Research Centre	Dependency of human and animal health and wellbeing on sustained environment.; Human and ecosystem health exists in socio-ecological interactions
Planetary health	Introduced in 1970–80s, and repopularized by Lancet Commission and Rockefeller Foundation	Anthropomorphized view of impact and interconnectedness of humans with the Earth at all levels
One Welfare	Emerged in 2015 for promotion of the links between animal welfare and human wellbeing	Highlights the interconnection of animal welfare, human wellbeing, and environment to foster interdisciplinary collaboration in order to improve human and animal welfare
Beyond One Ocean Health (B1OH)	Impacts of environmental change on health of ecosystems and organisms with emphasis on ocean	Highlights transdisciplinary actions on aquatic ecosystems, interconnected integrated systems and health through sustainable developments; Links healthy ocean with health and equity.
Public health		Population-based (instead of individual); Focus on health promotion and prevention (instead of treatment and rehabilitation); Social, cultural, economic, political, and environmental determinant of health
Global health	Supraterritoriality of health	Transboundary health threats

=== EcoHealth and One Health ===
EcoHealth and One Health, while sharing a common foundation in systems-level thinking that challenges traditional biomedical reductionism, diverge significantly in their historical roots, core focus, and disciplinary scope. EcoHealth, grounded in the premise that human health and well-being are fundamentally dependent on the health of the environment, seeks a broad understanding of health that integrates the humanities with the natural, social, and health sciences. It is primarily concerned with the complex interactions between humans, ecosystems, and the socio-ecological factors that influence them . In contrast, One Health evolved directly from the fields of veterinary and human medicine, with a primary focus on human-animal disease transmission and the human-animal health interface. Traditionally, One Health placed less emphasis on the role of the environment compared to EcoHealth, though its conceptual scope has recently expanded to include broader concerns such as food security, climate change adaptation, and biodiversity. Given these different traditions, they have developed distinct practices, leading to ongoing calls for closer collaboration to leverage their complementary strengths such as applying One Health's economic analysis to EcoHealth, or situating One Health research within the context of environmental degradation. While some scholars argue the two approaches will inevitably converge, others contend that persistent differences in discipline segregation and research practices currently limit integration, suggesting that methodologies to facilitate collaboration are still needed.

==== Examples ====
A practical example of health ecology is the management of malaria in Mexico. A multidisciplinary approach ended the use of harmful DDT while reducing malaria cases. This study reveals the complex nature of these problems, and the extent to which a successful solution must cross research disciplines. The solution involved creative thinking on the part of many individuals and produced a win-win situation for researchers, businesses, and, most importantly, the community. Although many of the dramatic effects of ecosystem change, and much of the research, are focused on developing countries, the ecosystem of the artificial environment in urban areas of the developed world is also a significant determinant of human health. Obesity, diabetes, asthma, and heart disease are all directly tied to environmental factors. In addition, urban design and planning determine automobile use, available food choices, air pollution levels, and the safety and walkability of the neighborhoods in which people live.

== See also ==
- Planetary health
