= Comparative medicine =

Comparative medicine is a distinct discipline of experimental medicine that uses animal models of human and animal disease in translational and biomedical research. In other words, it relates and leverages biological similarities and differences among species to better understand the mechanism of human and animal disease. It has also been defined as a study of similarities and differences between human and veterinary medicine including the critical role veterinarians, animal resource centers, and Institutional Animal Care and Use Committees play in facilitating and ensuring humane and reproducible lab animal care and use. The discipline has been instrumental in many of humanity's most important medical advances.

== History ==
=== The ancient world ===
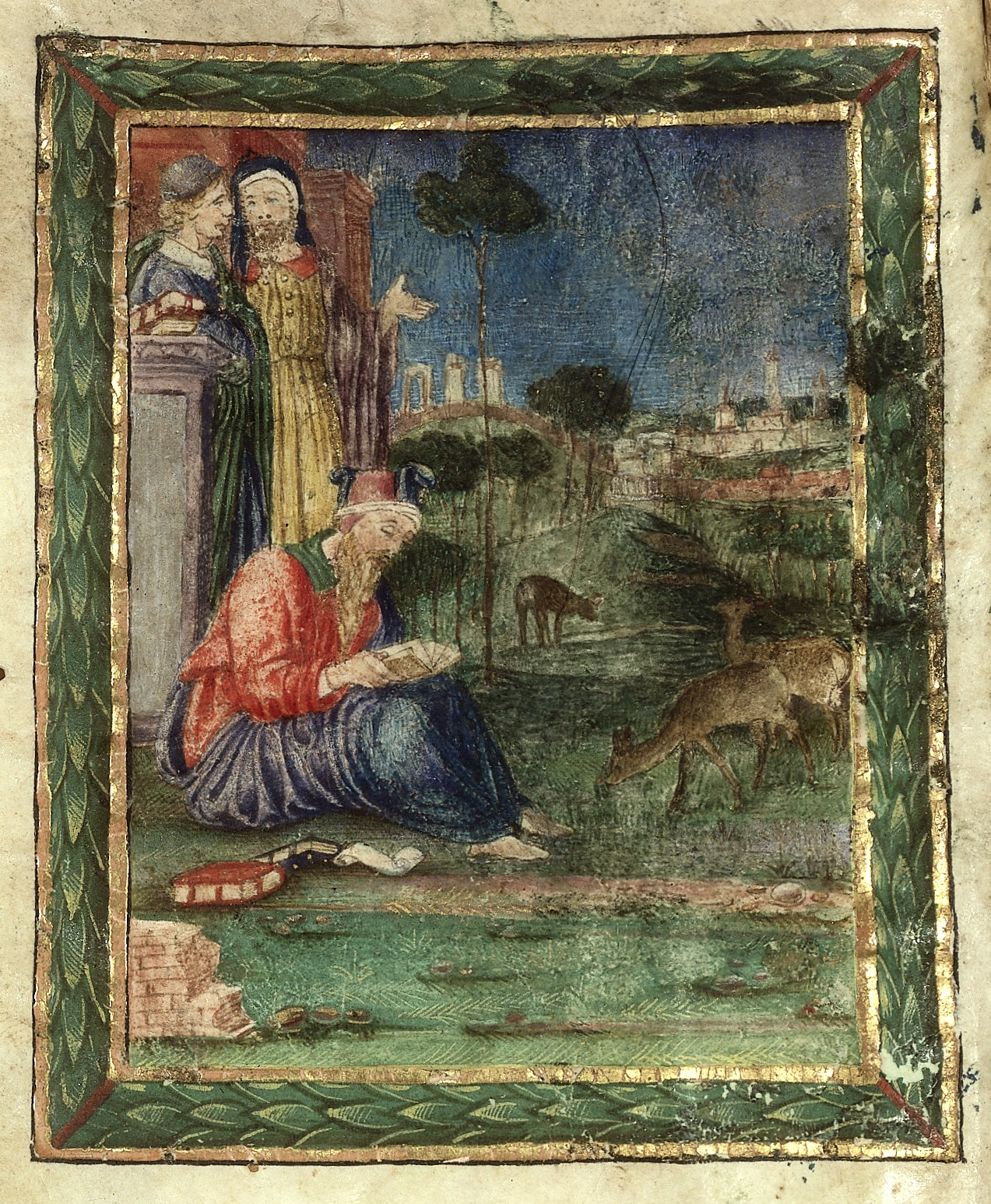
Hippocrates, Aphorismi, manuscript. Wellcome L0002463

The first documented mention of comparative pathology comes from Hippocrates (460 - 370 BCE) in Airs, Waters, Places where he describes relevant case histories for horse herds and human populations. He insists that diagnosis be based on experience, observation, and logic. Aristotle (384 - 322 BCE) hypothesized about interspecies transmission of disease. The anatomy and physiology schools opened in Alexandria by Erasistratus (404 - 320 BCE) and Herophilus (330 - 255 BCE) were directly inspired by Aristotle's work. Although most of the documents were destroyed when the Library of Alexandria burned.

In his Disciplinarum Libri IX, Marcus Terentius Varro (c. 100 BCE) made early indications of the germ theory of disease with his conception that tiny invisible animals carried with the air caused disease by entering through the nose and mouth. He also warned people against establishing homes near swamplands. Aulus Cornelius Celsus (25 BCE - 50 CE) wrote of experimental physiology in De Medicini Libri Octo detailing numerous dissections and vivisections he performed and pointed out specific interventions as well, such as cupping to remove the poison of a dog's bite.

By the time of Claudius Galen (129 - 200 CE), whose name lives on in the term Galenic formulation, human dissection was no longer acceptable and his vivisection studies of comparative anatomy relied mostly on the use of Barbary macaques. This resulted in several persistent misunderstandings of human anatomy. Another key early contributor to early comparative medicine through publication of his Digestorum Artis Mulomedicinae libri in 500 CE was Publius Flavius Vegetius Renatus. A work that continued to be published and used in medicine as late as the 16th century.

=== Middle Ages and early Renaissance ===
The post-antique European world gave rise to a dominant monotheistic culture and with it a de facto ban on human dissection. As such, there was a slow down in comparative medicine's progress through the Middle Ages. This was to be codified in 1637 CE with René Descartes manuscript Discourse on the Method. The Persian physician Muhammad ibn Zakariya al-Razi (865 - 925 CE) was the first to describe smallpox and measles and prescribe treatments, making his discoveries largely through animal dissection.

Due to the far flung nature of their travels the Crusaders imported the Oriental rat flea carrying the bacterium Yersinia pestis and eventually initiating the Black Death. The massive deleterious effect of the pandemic brought on serious consideration of inoculation and transmission chiefly through the work of Albertus Magnus (1206 - 1280 CE). In the book Liber de Animalibus he discussed human and animal plagues in addition to narrowing down the method of transmission to bites, contact with animals, or respiration of sick air from the diseased.

Girolamo Fracastoro (1478 - 1553 CE) outlined a concept for rapidly multiplying minute bodies (germs) transmitting infection in De contagione et contagiosis morbis. The theory was widely praised but fell into disuse until Louis Pasteur and Robert Koch developed an empirical version. The beginnings of microbiology, and thus serious use of comparative medicine, were finally enabled by Antonie Philips van Leeuwenhoek's refinement of the microscope and subsequent observation of animalcules.

=== The early modern period ===
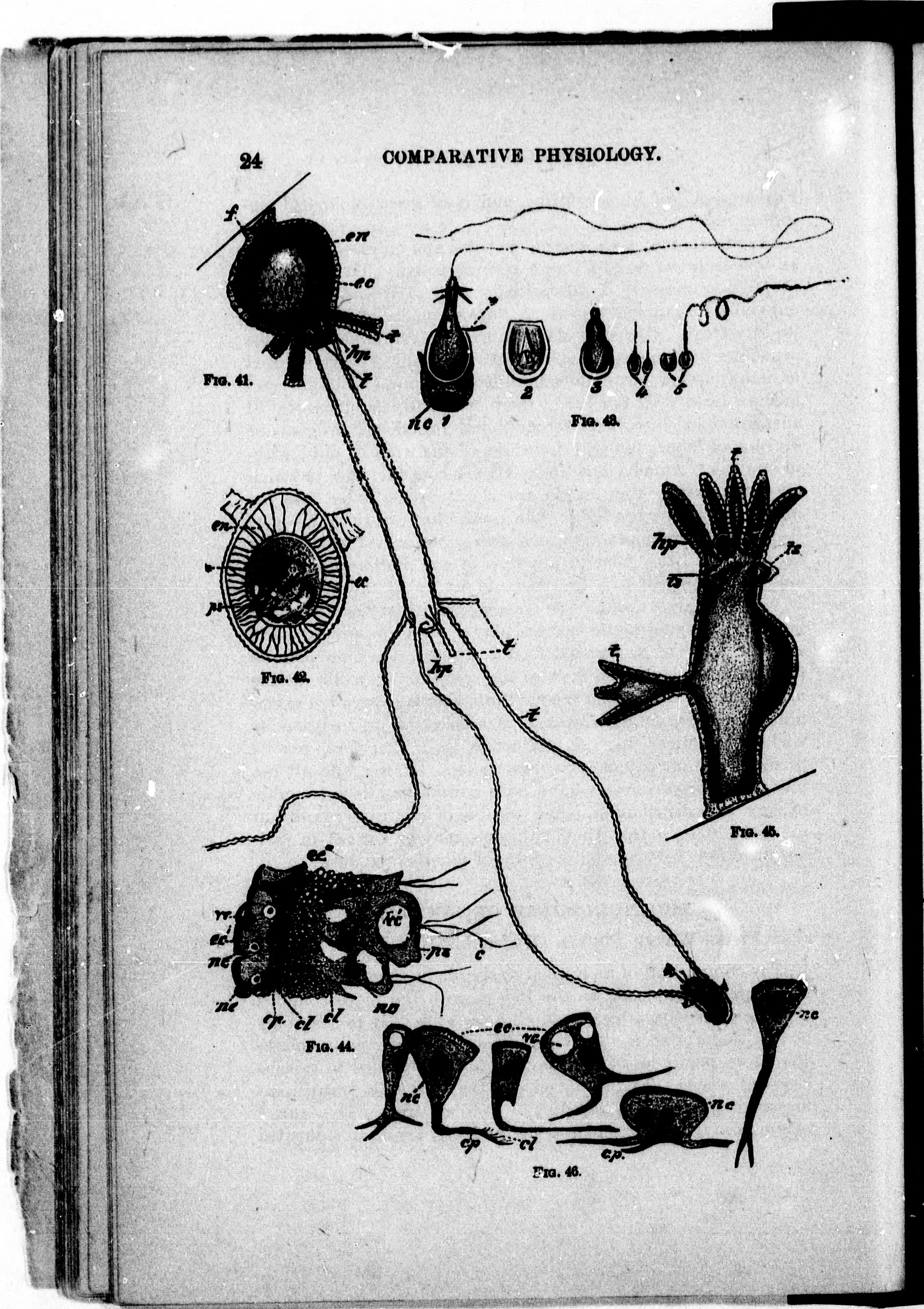
A text-book of comparative physiology (microform) - for students and practitioners of comparative (veterinary) medicine (1890) (20011433214)

The first real basis for the structured and regular exchange of knowledge of science and medicine in the western world was established with the 1660 founding of the Royal Society in London. Robert Doyle (1627 - 1691) published key experiments in their classical journal Philosophical Transactions among them interspecies blood transfusion, including from sheep into men.

The 18th century brought new plagues and faster communications to Europe creating a fruitful environment for a comparative approach to transfer and contagion. Along with the technology of transference as an experimental in vivo approach to medicine. At this stage it was already established in China that it was possible to use pox crusts as an effective treatment for smallpox infections. Emanuel Timone (1665 - 1741) was the first westerner to publish anything on inoculation, which he called grafting, although it's unclear if he developed it de novo (as new) or inferred it from previous work.

At this point animal medicine was generally absent from Europe. Bernado Ramazzini (1633 - 1714) and Giovanni Maria Lancisi (1654 - 1720) were the first to draw attention to the danger the general population faced from animal plagues. This and other work paved the way for Mortimer Cromwell, a secretary of the Royal Society, to raise plagues as a national health issue enabling a general policy of quarantine, isolation, fumigation, and slaughter. Erasmus Darwin was also impacted by the tragedy of the plagues and it resulted in the publication of his Zoonomia where he discusses infectious disease of both humans and animals.

In 1802 French physiologist François Magendie (1783 - 1855) became the first person to prove interspecies transmission of disease by inoculating a dog from rabies using human spittle. He also experimented with the injection of putrid fish into animals and was an advocate for experimentation in a time before anesthetics were developed.

With their usefulness to human health and respectable scientific standing established there were veterinary colleges founded in France, Austria, Sweden, Denmark, Netherlands, and Germany throughout the 18th century. It was Claude Bourgelat, the founder of the first veterinary college in Lyon France in 1761, who, prior to the existence of the veterinary profession, coined the term "comparative pathobiology". When the Royal Veterinary College was established in London in 1790 many students from France moved to England. Among them were John Hunter (1728 - 1793) an anatomist and surgeon that had an interest in comparative anatomy and animal physiology. His teaching on infectious disease was influential on subsequent generations.

=== Modern medicine ===
A most prominent student of Hunter's was Edward Jenner (1749 - 1823). He introduced animal models for rabies and showed that dogs could be inoculated with the spittle of infected animals. In a 1796 experiment, Jenner demonstrated inoculation from smallpox by exposure to and transmission of the milder cowpox. Jenner's work, a breakthrough in vaccinology and an important precursor to immunology in general, is generally credited as the very beginning of modern medicine. The experiments of Jenner and others set the stage for certain inoculation programs to be introduced to the general public. The first of such programs was directed by Jean-Baptist Edouard Bousquet (1794 - 1872) laid out guidelines for advisability, inoculation, and re-inoculation.

The first university chair of comparative medicine was established in 1862 resultant to the vision of Émile Littré a French politician and former student of medicine.

Robert Koch (1843 - 1910) discovered the pathogens responsible for anthrax, tuberculosis, and cholera. He won a Nobel Prize in Physiology or Medicine in 1905 He used animal models to complement knowledge of human biology.

In 1863 John Gamgee (1831 - 1894) organized the first conference of what would evolve into the World Veterinary Association. Subsequent conferences, such as one on animal vaccination in 1880, led George Fleming to propose in The Lancet that a chair of comparative pathology be established in all medical schools.

Rudolf Virchow (1821 - 1902) initiated modern pathology with his studies of dogs that lead to distinguishing between pyemia, sepsis, thrombosis, and embolisms. He made observations based on experiments in animals that led to specific medical interventions for humans, a hallmark of comparative medicine.

Auguste Chauveau (1827 - 1917) experimented on sepsis, and chaired a commission that was responsible for anticipating that smallpox itself could be attenuated by passage through cattle.

Louis Pasteur (1822 - 1895) inoculated several animal species against rabies and was able to cure a young boy of the disease. There was much controversy surrounding Pasteur's work after his death when his lab notebooks revealed questionable reporting techniques and the suppression of the work of others in his field such as Pierre Paul Émile Roux.

Salomon Stricker (1834 - 1898) founded The Institute of Experimental Pathology in 1872, which in 2010 was renamed the Institute of Pathophysiology and Allergy Research to conform to modern nomenclature. From its inception the institute was devoted to laboratory experimentation involving animals.

William H. Welch (1850 - 1934) was the founding president of the Rockefeller Institute of Medical Research in 1901. It was the first American equivalent to the Pasteur and Koch institutes in Europe. In addition to establishing an institute for animal pathology they began publishing the Journal of Experimental Medicine (JEM) which is still a respected journal today. They are dedicated to the study on intact organisms and prioritize human studies.

Comparative medicine in the form of experimentation on rhesus monkeys was key to one of the achievements of modern medical science: Jonas Salk's development of the polio vaccine. In fact the typing portion of the studies - crucial for determining what type of vaccine was needed - required some 17,000 monkeys for the research. This lead Julius Youngner, one of the researchers on Salk's team to say, "The monkeys were the real heroes of this thing,"

== After polio and into the 21st century ==
=== HIV/AIDS research ===
Comparative medicine, particularly through the use of macaque and rhesus monkeys as animal models, has been used in the development of treatment for HIV and AIDS. although there are severe limitations due to the uniqueness of simian immunodeficiency virus (SIV) compared to the human virus and a better animal model is needed.

=== One medicine ===
The concept of One Medicine is an idea from the 1970s and can be attributed to Calvin Schwabe (1927 – 2006) from his book Veterinary Medicine and Human Health. The idea takes the existing interdisciplinary nature of comparative medicine a step further and considers veterinary and human healthcare to be sufficiently overlapped as to be different aspects of the same thing. These concepts are carried into the 21st century in works such as Zoobiquity and in developments in research for heart transplants, management of psychiatric disorders, prosthetic limbs, cancer treatments and vaccine development. Despite the potential of this emergent field it has thus far failed to realize its full potential due to the limited interaction of veterinary and medical sciences.

== Research concerns ==
=== The translational gap ===
Despite the usefulness of a comparative approach to medicine and the utility of animal models the literature is fraught with many examples of promising in vivo research failing to translate effectively from animals to humans. This has raised concerns about reliability, predictive value, and the potential harm that inadequate measures can cause people. Some researchers have noted that a distinction between exploratory and confirmatory approaches can improve translation.

A few examples:

- In 2004, an anti inflammatory drug called rofecoxib (also as Vioxx) was withdrawn after a reported 88,000-140,000 people suffered heart attacks.
- 150 potential treatments for stroke, considered successful following animal tests have gone on to fail in human clinical trials.
- In 2013, human trials of an HIV vaccine, based on experiments in monkeys, were halted when it was discovered that the vaccine did not work.
- In 2007, a drug for Parkinson's disease, CEP-1347, failed clinical trial in humans after being considered successful in animal tests.
- Many potential treatments for Alzheimer's disease have failed. The rate of attrition recently being announced as an 'astounding 99.6%'. A recent study looked at 244 compounds in 413 clinical trials for Alzheimer's disease between 2002 and 2012. Of those only one was approved.
- A US study concluded that only one of eight drugs which enter clinical trials will be approved, with 80% of new drugs being abandoned by drugs companies.

There is a current focus in the research community on using the proper context for interpreting animal models and developing better ones.

=== Reproducibility ===
Reproducibility has been defined as the ability of a result to be replicated through independent experiments within the same or different laboratories. There are serious concerns about the repeatability of pre-clinical trials with published estimates of irreproducibility ranging from 51% to 89%. These concerns are part of the larger reproducibility crisis in science.

Some of the reasons for the lack of reproducibility in many studies are:

- Poor study design, errors in research, and potential fraud.
- An over-reliance on statistical significance coupled with small study sizes.
- At the 2nd International Symposium on Systematic Reviews in Laboratory Animal Science (2013) it was pointed out that publication bias and lack of sufficient power analysis is an issue.
- Research done across multiple labs at the same time, even as few as 2 to 4, shows a significantly better chance of being replicable.

=== Ethics ===
The theory of utilitarianism and the concept of greater good is most often used as a rationale for animal research in comparative medicine and elsewhere. The basic idea is that the actions that produce the greatest good for the greatest number are moral actions, meaning that new drugs and therapies along with the decreased suffering of humans and animals justifies the use of some animals in research. There are concerns that animal experimentation that has no translational benefit or reproducibility is likely unethical.

There are philosophers that believe that animal testing violates an animal's dignity and is ethically wrong. Until a better alternative is found though the majority of the scientific community continue to take the utilitarian approach.

== Legal considerations ==
Animal testing regulations are laws and/or guidelines that permit and control the use of animals for experimentation. They are of interest to comparative medicine given the overlap of the discipline and animal experimentation. The regulations vary around the world, but most governments aim to control the number of times animals are used; numbers used; and degree of pain.

== See also ==
- Medical research
- Animal testing
- Generic Model Organism Database
- History of animal testing
- Comparative psychology
- Veterinary ethics
