= Zoobiquity =

2012 book by Barbara Natterson-Horowitz and Kathryn Bowers

- Author: Barbara Natterson-Horowitz, Kathryn Bowers
- Publication date: 2012
- ISBN: 9780753539835

Zoobiquity is a 2012 non-fiction science book co-written by the cardiologist Barbara Natterson-Horowitz and Kathryn Bowers. It was a New York Times Bestseller.

== Content ==
The book takes a cross-species approach to medical maladies, highlighting the many afflictions that plague humans as well as animals.

It documents UCLA cardiologist Natterson-Horowitz’s experiences as a cardiovascular consultant to the Los Angeles Zoo. The authors also consulted medical and veterinary journals (such as Journal of the American College of Cardiology, Journal of Applied Animal Welfare Science, The New England Journal of Medicine, and Journal of Experimental Biology), as well as newspapers and science magazines.

The book is divided into twelve chapters, with each focusing on a human condition alongside its animal parallel. Topics cover a broad range of disease-both physical and behavioral.

The authors point out cross-species risk factors, such as the finding that both jaguars and many Ashkenazi Jewish women carry the BRCA1 genetic mutation that increases breast cancer risk. It also discusses practices that reduce risk factors in animals, noting that both dairy cows and spayed dogs are at reduced risk of breast cancer.

The book highlights diseases that are found in both humans and animals, including obsessive-compulsive disorder in dogs, high rates of chlamydia in koalas, and horses plagued by self-harming behavior. Parallels to drug addiction are seen in wallabies and bighorn sheep indulging in hallucinogenic substances.

== History ==
Natterson-Horowitz’s interest in bridging human and animal medicine began after the Los Angeles Zoo called her to consult on an emperor tamarin suffering from heart failure. While examining the tamarin, a veterinarian warned her against inducing capture myopathy, a term with which the cardiologist was unfamiliar. Further research led Natterson-Horowitz to equate capture myopathy with the human condition Takotsubo cardiomyopathy. From there, the doctor and Bowers began researching other similarities between human and animal health.

The book shares common ground with the One Health Initiative, a movement designed to increase collaboration between various disciplines of medicine, which was formalized in 2007. An international contingent of more than 850 scientists, physicians, and veterinarians has approved the One Health movement.

== Critical reception ==
Philosopher Julian Baggini, in a review for The Guardian called Zoobiquity a “readable and entertaining manifesto,” but noted, “Interesting though these examples are, the book rarely delivers on its promise that bridging the animal-human divide will reap major health benefits, offering instead a promissory note for future developments.”

In a New York Journal of Books review, Diane Brandley calls Zoobiquity an “ambitious work,” saying, “Not only has Barbara Natterson-Horowitz presented a very credible argument for collaboration between disciplines, but she has done so in a most entertaining and beautifully written manner.”

Zoobiquity has received accolades that include: New York Times bestseller, a Discover Magazine Best Book of 2012, the China Times 2013 Best Book for Translated Title, and a finalist in the AAAS/Subaru SB&F Prize for Excellence in Science Books.

== Related events ==
A conference named after the book was initiated in 2011 in an attempt to bring together leaders from both human and animal medicine for discussions of diseases that affect both people and non-human animals. The first two Zoobiquity Conferences were hosted in 2011 and 2012 in Los Angeles by the David Geffen School of Medicine at UCLA, School of Veterinary Medicine at the University of California, Davis and the Los Angeles Zoo and Botanical Gardens. The 2013 Zoobiquity Conference was held in New York and organized by the David Geffen School of Medicine at UCLA, the Wildlife Conservation Society and Bronx Zoo and the Animal Medical Center. The 2014 Zoobiquity Conference was hosted in Seattle by the University of Washington School of Medicine, the College of Veterinary Medicine at Washington State University and the Woodland Park Zoo. In 2015, the Cummings School of Veterinary Medicine at Tufts University hosted the 2015 Zoobiquity Conference in Boston.

Zoobiquity Conferences outside of the United States have been hosted by the University of Sydney in Australia and Utrecht University in the Netherlands.

The 6th annual Zoobiquity Conference is scheduled for April 2, 2016 in Philadelphia. This latest installment is a collaboration between the Pennsylvania Veterinary Medicine Association and the College of Veterinary Medicine and Perelmen School of Medicine at the University of Pennsylvania.

== Adaptations ==
Zoobiquity is in development as a television series by 20th Century Fox TV. The pilot episode will be written and produced by Bones producers, Stephen Nathan and Jon Collier. Spencer Medof will also executive produce the medical drama, which depicts a physician and a veterinarian working together to save human and animal lives. Natterson-Horowitz and Bowers are on board as producers.
