= National Academy of Medicine =

American medical society

- Formation: 1970; 56 years ago (as 'Institute of Medicine')
- Type: NGO
- Coordinates: 38.8968°N 77.0194°W
- President: Monica Bertagnolli
- Parent organization: National Academies of Sciences, Engineering, and Medicine
- Website: nam.edu
- Formerly called: Institute of Medicine

The National Academy of Medicine (NAM), known as the Institute of Medicine until 2015, is an American nonprofit, non-governmental organization (though created by and mostly funded by the US government). The National Academy of Medicine is a part of the National Academies of Sciences, Engineering, and Medicine, along with the National Academy of Sciences (NAS), National Academy of Engineering (NAE), and the National Academies of Sciences, Engineering, and Medicine (NASEM).

Operating outside the framework of the United States federal government, it relies on a volunteer workforce of scientists and other experts, operating under a formal peer-review system. As a national academy, the organization annually elects new members with the help of its existing members; the election is based on the person's distinguished and continuing achievements in a relevant field as well as for their willingness to actively participate.

== History ==
The institute was founded in 1970, under the congressional charter of the National Academy of Sciences as the Institute of Medicine.

On April 28, 2015, NAS membership voted in favor of reconstituting the membership of the IOM as a new National Academy of Medicine and establishing a new division on health and medicine within the NRC that has the program activities of the IOM at its core. These changes took effect on July 1, 2015.

== Presidents ==
Presidents of the Institute of Medicine and National Academy of Medicine
No.	Image	President	Term
1		John R. Hogness	1970–1974
2		Donald S. Fredrickson	1974–1975
3		David A. Hamburg	1975–1980
4		Frederick C. Robbins	1980–1985
5		Samuel O. Thier	1985–1991
6		Kenneth I. Shine	1992–2002
7		Harvey V. Fineberg	2002–2013
8		Victor J. Dzau	2014–2026
9		Monica Bertagnolli	2026–present

== Overview ==
The National Academies attempt to obtain authoritative, objective, and scientifically balanced answers to difficult questions of national importance. The work is conducted by committees of volunteer scientists—leading national and international experts—who serve without compensation. Committees are chosen to assure the requisite expertise and avoid bias or conflict of interest. Every report produced by committee undergoes extensive review and evaluation by a group of external experts who are anonymous to the committee, and whose names are revealed only once the study is published. Effective July 1, 2026, Monica Bertagnolli, former director of the National Institutes of Health (NIH), is President, succeeding Victor Dzau, who served as President and Chairman of the Council since July 1, 2014. The Leonard D. Schaeffer Executive Officer is Emilie Marcus, succeeding J. Michael McGinnis, who served in the role from 2015-2026.

The majority of studies and other activities are requested and funded by the federal government. Private industry, foundations, and state and local governments also initiate studies, as does the academy itself. Reports are made available online for free by the publishing arm of the United States National Academies, the National Academies Press, in multiple formats.

The academy is both an honorific membership organization and a policy research organization. Its members, elected on the basis of their professional achievement and commitment to service, serve without compensation in the conduct of studies and other activities on matters of significance to health. Election to active membership is both an honor and a commitment to serve in Institute affairs. The bylaws specify that no more than 80 new members shall be elected annually, including 10 from outside the United States. The announcement of newly elected members occurs at the Annual Meeting in October. As of October 20, 2015, the number of regular members plus international and emeritus members is 2,012. An unusual diversity of talent among NAM members is assured by the charter stipulation that at least one-quarter be selected from outside the health professions, from such fields as the natural, social, and behavioral sciences, as well as law, administration, engineering, and the humanities.

The New York Times called the NAM (then called the IOM) the United States' "most esteemed and authoritative adviser on issues of health and medicine, and its reports can transform medical thinking around the world".

=== NAM Perspectives ===
NAM publishes a weekly periodical, NAM Perspectives, described as "a venue for leading health, medical, science, and policy experts to reflect on issues and opportunities important to the advancement of the NAM's mission". Papers present evidence-based descriptions and individual viewpoints on strategies and priorities, and must be accessible to a broad audience.

== Awards ==
The Rhoda and Bernard Sarnat International Prize in Mental Health (Sarnat Prize) was established in 1992 and is awarded annually by the Academy to recognize individuals, groups, or organizations for outstanding achievement in improving mental health. It is accompanied by a medal and $20,000.

== Notable members, past and present ==
- Harold Amos, microbiologist and professor
- Nancy Andrews, Dean of Duke University School of Medicine
- Andrea Baccarelli, Professor and Chair of Environmental Health Sciences at Columbia University and President of the International Society of Environmental Epidemiology.
- Elizabeth Blackburn, biologist and winner of 2009 Nobel Prize in Physiology or Medicine for co-discovery of telomerase
- Patricia Flatley Brennan, Director of the National Library of Medicine
- Emery N. Brown, statistician, neuroscientist, and anesthesiologist, Director of the Harvard–MIT Program of Health Sciences and Technology
- Namandjé Bumpus, pharmacologist and the Chief Scientist of the Food and Drug Administration
- Atul Butte, pediatrician and scientist at the University of California, San Francisco
- Robert Califf, cardiologist, FDA Deputy Commissioner
- Ben Carson, columnist and retired American neurosurgeon, former director of pediatric neurosurgery at Johns Hopkins Hospital
- Anthony Cerami, pioneering medical researcher
- Dennis S. Charney, dean of the Mount Sinai School of Medicine in New York City
- Sarah Cleaveland, veterinary epidemiologist
- Jewel Plummer Cobb, cell biologist and President of California State University, Fullerton, 1981–90
- Francis Collins, geneticist, leader in the Human Genome Project and Director of National Institutes of Health
- Jim Collins, synthetic biology pioneer and MacArthur genius
- Toby Cosgrove, cardiothoracic surgeon, inventor, and CEO, Cleveland Clinic
- Mark Daly, statistician and human geneticist, professor of genetics at Harvard Medical School
- Kenneth L. Davis, author, medical researcher and CEO of Mount Sinai Medical Center
- Anthony Fauci Lienhard Award for Decades of Work Improving Public Health and Leadership in Shaping COVID-19 Pandemic Response
- Stanton A. Glantz, Professor of Medicine (UCSF) and prominent tobacco control researcher and activist
- Shimon Glick, Ben Gurion University, endocrinology, internal medicine, medical education and medical ethics
- Farshid Guilak, Biomedical engineering and orthopaedic researcher, Shriners Hospitals for Children and Washington University in St. Louis
- Margaret Hamburg, commissioner of the U.S. Food and Drug Administration
- Mary Hawn, chair of surgery at Stanford University
- Maurice Hilleman, microbiologist
- Anna Huttenlocher, a rheumatologist and cell biologist
- David Ho, a pioneer in the use of protease inhibitors in treating HIV-infected patients
- Leroy Hood, winner of the 2003 Lemelson–MIT Prize
- Harold Jaffe, physician, epidemiologist, and early HIV/AIDS researcher
- Arthur Kellermann, professor and founding chairman of the department of Emergency Medicine at Emory University
- Herbert Kleber, professor of psychiatry, Yale University
- Philip J. Landrigan, pediatrician and children's environmental health advocate
- Jeffrey Lieberman, chair of psychiatry, Columbia University; president, American Psychiatric Association
- Rudolph Leibel, MD, professor at Columbia University and discoverer of leptin and leptin receptor
- Alice H. Lichtenstein, senior scientist and director of Cardiovascular Nutrition Laboratory at Human Nutrition Research Center on Aging, professor at Tufts University
- Susan Lindquist, a molecular biologist and former Director of the Whitehead Institute
- Howard Markel, George E. Wantz Distinguished Professor of the History of Medicine and Director of the Center for the History of Medicine at the University of Michigan
- Jonna Mazet, professor of epidemiology at UC Davis School of Veterinary Medicine and executive director of the One Health Institute
- Maclyn McCarty, youngest member of the research team responsible for the Avery–MacLeod–McCarty experiment
- Sherilyn S. McCoy, CEO of Avon Products and former Vice Chairman of Johnson & Johnson
- Ruslan Medzhitov, professor of immunobiology at Yale University, co-discoverer of human Toll-like receptors (TLRs)
- David O. Meltzer, Professor of Medicine and health economist at University of Chicago
- Mario J. Molina, recipient of the 1995 Nobel Prize in Chemistry for discovery of impact of CFCs on ozone layer
- Sean J. Morrison, stem cell biologist and director of the Children's Medical Center Research Institute at UT Southwestern Medical Center
- Herbert Needleman, pediatrician and psychiatrist
- Carl F. Nathan, Professor of Immunology and Microbial Pathogenesis at Weill Cornell Medicine
- Peter R. Orszag, 37th Director of the Office of Management and Budget under President Barack Obama
- Nicholas A. Peppas, pioneer of biomaterials and drug delivery
- Megan Ranney, emergency physician, deputy dean of the Brown University School of Public Health, public health leader and communicator
- Frederick Redlich, dean of the Yale School of Medicine from 1967 to 1972
- James Rothman, winner of the 2002 Albert Lasker Award for Basic Medical Research
- Charles Rotimi, epidemiologist and Chief & Senior Investigator at the National Human Genome Research Institute
- Jeffrey Sachs, economist and director of The Earth Institute at Columbia University
- David A. Savitz, director of the Disease Prevention and Public Health Institute at the Mount Sinai Medical Center
- Richard A. Smith, physician
- Shirley M. Tilghman, former president of Princeton University
- Abraham Verghese, novelist and recipient of the National Humanities Medal
- Mary Wakefield, appointed administrator of the Health Resources and Services Administration (HRSA) by President Barack Obama in February 2009
- Douglas C. Wallace, geneticist and pioneer of human mitochondrial genetics
- Lawrence Weed, creator of the problem-oriented medical record
- Sheldon Weinbaum, biomedical engineer, biofluid mechanician and Distinguished Professor, Emeritus, at the City College of New York
- Ben Weston, Chief Health Policy Advisor for Milwaukee County
- Kern Wildenthal, former president of the University of Texas Southwestern Medical School
- William Julius Wilson, sociologist
- Elias Zerhouni, former executive vice-dean of Johns Hopkins School of Medicine and director of the National Institutes of Health under George W. Bush

== See also ==
- List of members of the National Academy of Medicine
