= Albany Meadows =

Albany Meadows is a tract of approximately four acres (1.6 ha) of land at the Gill Tract in Albany, California. It is bounded by San Pablo Avenue to the east, Monroe Street to the north, 10th Street to the west, and Codornices Creek to the south.

Albany Meadows is the former site of residential buildings for student housing at the University Village. That housing was demolished in 2007, and the site is now home to native trees, grasses, wild turkeys, and other species. It serves as a wildlife corridor for a range of organisms, including owls, wild turkey, and deer.

== Controversy over development ==
Albany Meadows is part of a plan for commercial development by UC Berkeley Capital Projects. The plan includes 175-units of senior housing, a large-scale grocery retailer, space for two additional retailers, and a parking lot.

A series of protests and occupations occurred at Albany Meadows as part of an ongoing resistance to the plan for development known as Occupy the Farm.
