= Menangle =

Menangle may refer to:

- Menangle virus
- Menangle, New South Wales
