= Disease reservoir =

Disease reservoir may refer to:

- Natural reservoir, the long-term host of the pathogen of an infectious disease
- Fomite, any inanimate object or substance capable of carrying infectious organisms
