= Mazet =

Mazet is a French surname. Notable people with the surname include:

- François Mazet (born 1943), French racing cyclist
- Jonna Mazet (born 1967), American epidemiologist
- Julien Mazet (born 1981)is, a French cyclist

== See also ==
- Mazet-Saint-Voy, commune in Haute-Loire, France
