= Ben Weston =

Ben Weston may refer to:

- Ben Weston (sailor)
- Ben Weston (physician)
- Ben Weston (Days of Our Lives)
