= Natural reservoir =

Population or environment in which a pathogen naturally lives and reproduces

In infectious disease ecology and epidemiology, a natural reservoir, also known as a disease reservoir or a reservoir of infection, is the population of organisms or the specific environment in which an infectious pathogen naturally lives, persists, and reproduces, or upon which the pathogen primarily depends for survival. A reservoir is usually a living host of a particular species, such as an animal, human, or plant, within which the pathogen survives, often without causing severe disease in the reservoir itself. By some definitions, a reservoir may also be an environment external to an organism, such as contaminated water, soil, or air, if the pathogen can persist there long enough to contribute to transmission.

Because of the diversity of infectious microorganisms, their host ranges, and the different ecological systems in which they circulate, definitions of a natural reservoir are numerous and sometimes conflicting. In general, the reservoir concept applies most clearly to pathogens capable of infecting more than one host population and is defined relative to a target population, meaning the population in which disease occurrence is being studied or controlled. The reservoir is any population of organisms, or in some cases any environment, in which the pathogen is maintained and from which infection is transmitted to the target population. Reservoirs may involve one or more species, may be the same as or different from the target population, and in broad usage may overlap with vector based transmission systems, although vectors are generally considered distinct from reservoirs.

Identifying the natural reservoirs of infectious pathogens is important for preventing and controlling outbreaks in humans and domestic animals, particularly for zoonotic diseases and for diseases without effective vaccines. In some settings, reservoir directed interventions such as animal vaccination, reduction of human exposure, environmental remediation, or vector control may reduce transmission. However, identifying a true reservoir can be difficult, and for some pathogens, including the ebolaviruses, the presumed reservoir remains uncertain.

== Definition and terminology ==
The diversity of pathogens, hosts, and transmission systems has resulted in multiple definitions of the term natural reservoir, some of which emphasize a host species and others an ecological system. In a 2002 conceptual analysis published in Emerging Infectious Diseases, a natural reservoir was defined as "one or more epidemiologically connected populations or environments in which the pathogen can be permanently maintained and from which infection is transmitted to the defined target population".

The target population is the population or species in which the pathogen causes disease and in which epidemiologists are attempting to measure, predict, or prevent transmission. In many medical contexts, humans are the target population, but in veterinary and wildlife epidemiology the target may be livestock, companion animals, or wildlife. A population may therefore function as a reservoir in one epidemiological context but not in another.

Some definitions distinguish reservoirs from non reservoirs by the extent to which infected hosts develop clinical disease. Under this narrower interpretation, a reservoir host may harbor and transmit a pathogen while experiencing few or no symptoms. However, lack of symptoms is not required in all definitions, and some recognized reservoir hosts may still develop illness under certain conditions.

A pathogen capable of being maintained in more than one host population may have multiple natural reservoirs.

== Reservoir, source, and vector ==
The terms reservoir, source of infection, and vector are related but not synonymous. The reservoir is the ecological habitat in which a pathogen normally lives, persists, and reproduces. The source of infection is the person, animal, object, or substance from which a host actually acquires infection. In some cases the reservoir and the source are the same, but in others they differ. For example, contaminated water or food may serve as the immediate source of infection even when the long term reservoir is environmental or animal based.

A vector is a living organism, commonly an arthropod such as a mosquito, flea, or tick, that transmits a pathogen from one host to another. Vectors may play an essential role in transmission but are not automatically reservoirs. In some disease systems, the pathogen multiplies within the vector, whereas in others the vector mainly serves as a carrier. Distinguishing among reservoir, source, and vector is important in epidemiology because each implies different control strategies.

== Types of reservoirs ==
Natural reservoirs are commonly divided into three major categories: human, animal, and environmental.

== Human reservoirs ==
Human reservoirs are people infected with pathogens that exist on or within the human body. Some infections, such as poliomyelitis and smallpox, exist exclusively within human reservoirs and are sometimes described as anthroponoses. Humans can also act as reservoirs for sexually transmitted diseases, measles, mumps, streptococcal infection, and various respiratory pathogens.

Asymptomatic or presymptomatic people may still transmit infection, which makes human reservoirs especially important in the control of respiratory and enteric diseases.

Human reservoirs also include the commensal microbial communities that inhabit the body. For example, there are microbiomes in the gut, skin, vagina etc. which can harbour pathogenic organisms and antibiotic resistance genes without causing disease. These microbial populations may function as reservoirs for not only pathogens but also for genetic elements that enable resistance, collectively referred to as the resistome. Horizontal gene transfer mechanisms allow resistance genes to move between commensal and pathogenic bacteria within the same host increasing the potential for the emergence of drug-resistant infections. As a result, the human microbiome plays an important role in shaping transmission dynamics, particularly for antimicrobial resistance.

Understanding human reservoirs therefore requires not only identifying infected individuals, but also accounting for colonisation, microbial community structure and the movement of resistance genes within and between hosts. This perspective has become increasingly important in epidemiology as antimicrobial resistance is now recognised as a global public health challenge.

== Animal reservoirs ==
Animal reservoirs include domesticated and wild animals infected with pathogens that can be maintained in animal populations and transmitted to humans or other susceptible hosts. Many important zoonoses involve animal reservoir systems.

For example, the bacterium Vibrio cholerae, which causes cholera in humans, has natural reservoirs in copepods, zooplankton, and shellfish. Parasitic blood flukes of the genus Schistosoma, responsible for schistosomiasis, spend part of their life cycle inside freshwater snails before completing development in vertebrate hosts. Viruses of the taxon Ebolavirus, which cause Ebola virus disease, are thought to have a natural reservoir in bats or related wildlife species, although the exact reservoir system remains incompletely defined.

Other zoonotic diseases transmitted from animals to humans include rabies, blastomycosis, psittacosis, trichinosis, cat-scratch disease, histoplasmosis, coccidioidomycosis, and salmonella.

Common animal reservoirs include bats, rodents, cattle, pigs, sheep, rabbits, raccoons, dogs, and other mammals.

=== Bats ===
Numerous zoonotic diseases have been associated with bats. Their species diversity, social behavior, migration patterns, and long lifespan have all been proposed as reasons they are important hosts in the ecology of emerging viruses. Lyssaviruses, including the Rabies virus, henipaviruses, Menangle virus, Tioman virus, SARS related coronaviruses, and filoviruses have all been linked to different bat species. Fruit bats in particular serve as reservoir hosts for Nipah virus.

=== Rodents ===
Rodents are important reservoirs for several zoonotic pathogens. White footed mice (Peromyscus leucopus) are among the most important reservoirs for the Lyme disease spirochete Borrelia burgdorferi. Deer mice serve as reservoir hosts for Sin Nombre virus, which causes hantavirus pulmonary syndrome. Rats have also been implicated in the ecology of diseases such as Chagas disease and other rodent associated infections.

== Environmental reservoirs ==
Environmental reservoirs include living and non living reservoirs that harbor pathogens outside the bodies of animals. These reservoirs may occur in soil, water, plants, built environments, or air. Pathogens in these settings may be free living for part of their life cycle or may persist long enough to remain epidemiologically important.

Examples include Legionella pneumophila, which can persist in water systems and cause Legionnaires' disease, and Vibrio cholerae, which can survive in aquatic environments as well as in association with aquatic organisms. Environmental reservoirs are especially important in diseases influenced by sanitation, water quality, and contamination of built environments.

== Transmission from reservoirs ==
A disease reservoir functions as the ecological setting from which a pathogen reaches a susceptible host. Transmission may occur directly or indirectly, depending on the pathogen, host, and environmental conditions.

=== Direct transmission ===
Direct transmission occurs through immediate transfer of pathogens from an infected host or reservoir to a susceptible host. This includes skin contact, kissing, sexual contact, and short range droplet spread from coughing, sneezing, or talking.

Examples include Neisseria gonorrhoeae, transmitted through sexual contact, and Bordetella pertussis, transmitted through respiratory droplets from infected humans.

=== Indirect transmission ===
Indirect transmission occurs through intermediate routes such as airborne particles, contaminated food or water, fomites, or vectors. Airborne transmission involves pathogens carried over longer distances by suspended particles. Vehicles such as food, water, blood, and fomites can also passively transmit pathogens from reservoirs to susceptible hosts. Vector transmission may be mechanical, in which the pathogen is carried without developing inside the vector, or biological, in which part of the pathogen life cycle occurs within the vector.

Examples include campylobacteriosis, often spread through contaminated food or water, and malaria, caused by Plasmodium falciparum and transmitted by infected mosquitoes.

== One Health approach to reservoir surveillance and management ==
Understanding and managing natural reservoirs is a central component of the One Health framework, which recognizes that human, animal, and environmental health are closely interconnected. Because many emerging infectious diseases originate in animal reservoirs before spilling over into humans, identifying reservoir hosts and the conditions that facilitate transmission is an important part of outbreak prevention and pandemic preparedness.

The One Health approach emphasizes collaboration across medicine, veterinary science, wildlife biology, and environmental health. In practice, this includes surveillance of animal reservoir populations alongside human disease monitoring, laboratory capacity building, outbreak reporting systems, and community based strategies to reduce high risk exposure at the human animal interface.

== Climate change and shifting reservoirs ==
Climate change is increasingly recognized as a factor influencing the distribution, abundance, and behavior of reservoir species and vectors, with implications for the emergence and re emergence of infectious diseases. Rising temperatures, changing precipitation patterns, and extreme weather events can alter the geographic range of host and vector populations, creating new opportunities for pathogens to encounter susceptible hosts.

Environmental disruption linked to climate change, deforestation, agricultural expansion, and urbanization can also increase contact among wildlife, livestock, and humans, thereby increasing opportunities for pathogen spillover.

== Public health significance ==
A substantial proportion of human pathogens are zoonotic, which makes reservoir identification an important part of public health preparedness, surveillance, and prevention. Identifying which populations or environments maintain a pathogen can guide targeted interventions such as animal vaccination, reduction of wildlife exposure, vector control, sanitation measures, and environmental decontamination.

Reservoir surveillance has also become an important part of efforts to predict and prevent future outbreaks. Programs such as the PREDICT Project and other One Health initiatives have sought to improve detection of zoonotic threats at the wildlife human interface and strengthen preparedness for emerging infectious diseases.

== See also ==
- Spillover infection
- Zoonosis
- Reverse zoonosis
- One Health
- Emerging infectious disease
- Vector (epidemiology)
- Disease ecology
- PREDICT Project
