= WDN =

WDN may refer to:

- Walsden railway station, the station code WDN
- Wildlife Disaster Network, an American organization focusing on aiding wild animals
