= Occupy the Farm =

Protest group against economic inequality

- Part of Occupy movement, Via Campesina
- Date: First occupation: 22 April 2012 – 14 May 2012 / Second occupation: 11 May 2013 – 27 May 2013
- Location: Gill Tract, Albany, California; 37°53′7.23″N 122°18′0.44″W
- Goals: Land reform, Food sovereignty, Food security, The commons, Urban open space, Community center
- Methods: Occupation, Agroecology, Farming
- "Take Back The Tract". Archived from the original on 9 March 2022.

Occupy the Farm is an ongoing social movement that started with the 2012 occupation of the Gill Tract in Albany, California, in protest of planned commercial development of public land and in support of preserving the land for the creation of an open center for urban agroecology and food sovereignty.

The occupation began on 22 April 2012 and ended on 14 May 2012.

A second occupation was launched on 11 May 2013 on the south end of the Gill Tract, which was slated for privatization and construction of a parking lot, a chain grocery store, and an exclusive senior's home twice dissolved by UCPD. Eventually a community partnership with agroecology researchers at the College of Natural Resources for access to a portion of the Gill Tract was established.

Additional demonstrations were held in 2015 and 2016, and the development, including Sprouts Farmers Market, opened in 2017.

== History ==
The Gill Tract is a piece of agricultural land north of Monroe St. bounded by Marin Ave., Jackson St., and San Pablo Avenue, in Albany, California, administered by the University of California, Berkeley. The agricultural field has been the last open parcel of class I soil, soil that has "slight limitations that restrict [its] use", in the urban East Bay. The Gill Tract has been used by the University of California as an open-air laboratory for research and teaching since 1945, mostly for conducting plant genetics research using corn.

The original agricultural area was around 100 acres (40 ha); all but one-tenth of that has already been developed. Beginning in 1944, much of the nearby land was converted into federally owned housing for dock workers at the nearby shipyards. The federal housing complex, known as Codornices Creek Village, was later sold to the University of California for student housing in 1956 and renamed to UC Village.

== Background ==
The Gill Tract has been the focus of efforts to create an educational urban farm for an extended period of time, From 1997 to 2000 a group named Bay Area Coalition for Urban Agriculture (BACUA) backed by 30 community groups coordinated by Food First aimed to establish "the world’s first university center on sustainable urban agriculture and food systems". Since at least 1997, coalitions of local residents, NGOs, and University of California (UC) students and faculty have brought forth proposals to the UC administration for the creation of a center for sustainable urban agriculture. The UC administrators turned down these proposals, something at least three UC faculty involved with the projects say was due to UC administrators stonewalling the process and not giving the proposals a good faith consideration. From 2002 to at least 2005, a group named "Urban Roots" operated in a similar vein, endorsed by Alice Waters and Tom Bates. As of 2012, the southern half of the Gill Tract was unused and slated to be leased by the UC for commercial development of a for-profit senior housing complex and a Whole Foods grocery store.

== First occupation, 2012 ==
On 22 April 2012, (Earth Day) around 200 activists broke the lock on the gate, entered the tract, and began farming. Starting the action on 22 April was intended to be a show of solidarity with Via Campesina, an international movement of peasant organizations.

The stated intent of the participants was to establish a sustainable farm to provide food to the local community. Participants argued that such a farm could play an important role in educating the local community about sustainable agricultural practices while helping to establish food sovereignty in the local community. The organizers emphasized that their intention was to create a working farm, rather than simply occupy the land.

As of 30 April 2012, farmers tilled and planted at least two acres of land with crops, including carrots, broccoli, corn, tomatoes, and squash. They brought in beehives, chickens, and over 15,000 seedlings. The farmers set up a composting toilet and several portable toilets on site and have arranged for a certified professional to handle their waste disposal, in an effort to alleviate sanitation concerns.

As of 9 May 2012, activists were occupying the part of the tract slated for development, citing concerns that its ownership has been transferred from the College of Natural Resources to Capital Projects, an indication that the university plans to sell the entire Gill Tract to developers. The university denied that the remainder of the tract was slated for redevelopment, stating that they intend to use the land for research indefinitely. However, funding for research at the Gill Tract had receded to historically low levels of allocation, and one sole full professor continued to do research in biological control, on less than 1 of the 10 acres.

In response to the accusation of trespassing, the occupiers challenged the legitimacy of UC claims on the land, pointing out that the university's charter as a Land-grant university can be served by revitalizing the space for future research, not by sale on the commercial market and development, nor by its current derelict state. The occupation ended on 14 May 2012.

=== UC Berkeley reaction and dialogue ===
UC Berkeley officials condemned the occupation, saying that it threatened ongoing agricultural research and interfered with their duty to students and faculty, and that the occupied portion of the tract was then not slated for commercial development. Officers of the University of California Police Department repeatedly warned the farmers that their actions were illegal, but did not take further action. A UC Berkeley spokesperson said that they would enforce campus policy forbidding camping on University property only if they could do so "safely and effectively". In April 2012, the university cut off water to the tract, stating that the water system was not designed for habitation.

On 4 May 2012, UC Berkeley administrators said that if the farmers left on their own accord they would be included in future community planning processes and gave them until 5 May 2012 to leave the tract lest the administration take steps to "ensure the rule of law is maintained." On 7 May 2012, the farmers replied to the university, offering to disband their encampment if the university agreed to renew access to municipal water, continue access to the property for the duration of the farming season to finish growing the already planted crops, and guarantee that chemical fertilizers and pesticides would not be used on the site in the future. On 8 May 2012, the university issued a statement saying that there was "a stunning degree of arrogance and entitlement inherent in this group’s demands", and that after the encampment was dismantled, they would initiate an open dialogue headed by the Dean of the College of Natural Resources, while attempting to preserve as much of the already planted crops as would be possible without interfering with scheduled research on the tract.

The morning of 9 May 2012 heavy machinery brought concrete barricades in front of Ocean View Elementary School to prevent easy access to the occupation. Police brought a bulldozer into the farm and appeared ready to demolish, but retreated. A locked gate greeted Miguel Altieri as his students came to plant this year's experiments, and although vehicles were prevented from entering, a small number of tomatoes were still put in the ground to show determination to continue with the research. The remaining perimeter of chain-link fence around the tract remained unprotected, and was in danger of being removed by citizen volunteers, a similar fate as in the peaceful takeover of People's Park, Berkeley, on 15 May 1972.

UC began a lawsuit against 15 to 165 people they identified as leaders, RG12629392 "The Regents of the University of California VS Dayaneni".

=== College of Natural Resources reaction ===
The co-directors of the Berkeley Center for Diversified Farming Systems, part of UC Berkeley's College of Natural Resources released an open letter regarding the occupation, calling for the farmers to immediately decamp, the administrators to immediately set a date to discuss the future of the Gill Tract as an urban farm, and the researchers using the tract to work around the crops already planted by the farmers and to return the harvest to the community.

Some researchers who conduct research at the tract expressed concern that missing a planting season could threaten their future funding and harm the educational progress of their students if the occupation forces them to miss the upcoming planting season. For Damon Lisch, a researcher who works at the tract and fully dependent on grants, research stoppage would have endangered his future grant funding, threatening his livelihood. He spoke out against the occupation, stating that the farmers "made a series of poor decisions based on inadequate information" that have an unjust impact on the researchers who normally use the field during summer. The researchers active on the Gill Tract supported leaving the activist-planted crops in place, as long as they were permitted to conduct their research side by side with the new farm.

The farmers have made an active effort not to interfere with the agricultural research of Miguel Altieri which is currently being conducted on the site. Altieri has also hosted a teach-out at the occupied tract, and has spoken in support of the farmers, encouraging them to continue to occupy the land. He has also indicated that he will be working with the farmers directly to dry farm tomatoes. Altieri had been involved in the previous BACUA effort to transform the tract into an urban farm.

The senior editorial board of the Daily Cal student newspaper has stated that "the Occupy protesters farming on the Gill Tract in Albany have a promising, attainable goal". The idea of turning the Gill Tract into an urban farm has been endorsed by a number of Berkeley faculty members as well as the student senate. The occupation itself is opposed by the dean of the College of Natural Resources as well as the chair of UC Berkeley's Academic Senate, although the dean believes that the Gill Tract could be productively used for urban agriculture in the future.

== Second occupation, 2013 ==
A land occupation was launched again on 11 May 2013 on the south end of the Gill Tract, which was slated for privatization and construction of a parking lot, a chain grocery store, and an exclusive senior's home. Occupiers cleared the tall grass, tilled the land, and planted multiple vegetable gardens with support of more than 100 members of the community over that weekend. This second occupation was raided by UCPD on 14 May, but members of the movement and supporters returned to reoccupy and plant again on the following weeks. After a second police raid on the occupation encampment, the movement switched focus from land occupations to the establishment of a community partnership with agroecology researchers at the College of Natural Resources for access to a portion of the Gill Tract.

As UC continued to propose a development project with "Sprouts Farmer's Market", the movement organized a Boycott Sprouts campaign. As of December 2014 a 1.3-acre experimental urban farm on the north side, shared ground with a quarter-acre urban gardening project and a 2.5-acre plot devoted to corn genetics research.
