= Jonna Mazet =

American epidemiologist

Jonna Ann Keener Mazet
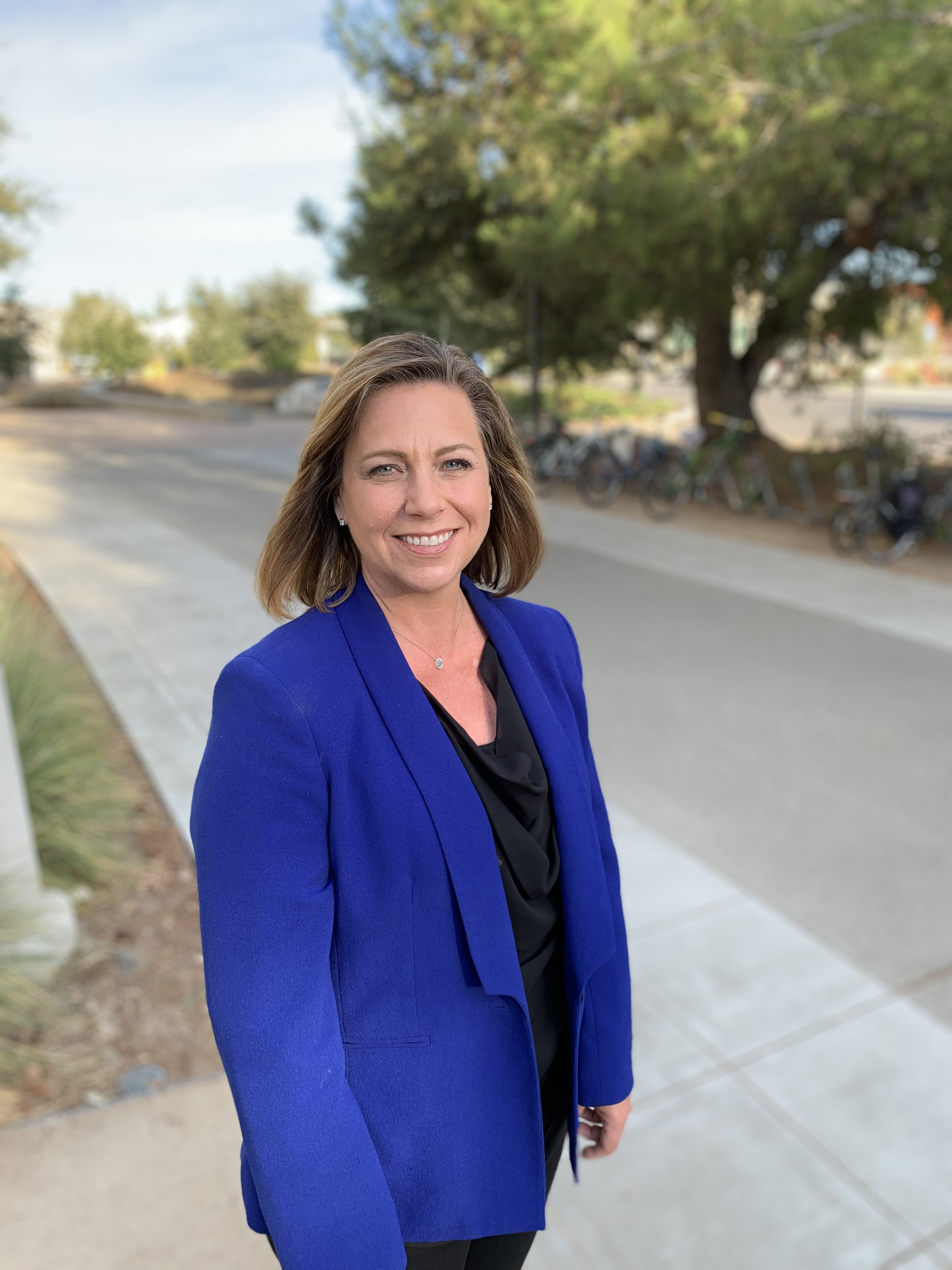
- Jonna Mazet on the University of California, Davis campus in October of 2019
- Born: December 18, 1967 (age 58); Marin County, California
- Education: UC Davis
- Awards: TEDMED Hive Innovator (2018)
- Scientific career
- Fields: Epidemiology, Disease ecology
- Workplaces: UC Davis

Jonna Ann Keener Mazet (born December 18, 1967) is an American veterinarian, epidemiologist and a Distinguished Professor of Epidemiology and Disease Ecology at the University of California, Davis. Since 2021, she has served as the Vice Provost of Grand Challenges at the University of California, Davis. UC Davis Grand Challenges focuses on developing climate solutions, preventing and responding to emerging health threats, promoting sustainable food systems, and reimagining the role of land-grant universities. Dr. Mazet is known for her contributions to operationalizing the One Health approach, which is now a component of the Quadripartite Organizations core mandates for addressing health challenges. In 2009, Dr. Mazet founded the One Health Institute at the University of California, Davis and served as the Executive Director until July 2020. She is an elected member of the National Academy of Medicine and a fellow of the American Association for the Advancement of Science.

Mazet is a leader in the field of One Health and is active in international research programs, most notably in relation to disease transmission among wildlife, domestic animals, and people and the ecological drivers of disease emergence. One Health is the collaborative effort across multiple disciplines (veterinary, human medical, environmental, etc.) to attain optimal health for animals, people, and the environment. As a member of the National Academy of Medicine, Mazet also chaired the National Academies’ One Health Action Collaborative and serves on the Forum for Microbial Threats. She is the founding chair of the One Health Action Collaborative (2016–2023) and previously chaired the Interest Group on Global Health, Infectious Diseases, and Microbiology (2017–2019) . She serves as a member of the National Academies’ Standing Committee on Emerging Infectious Diseases and 21st Century Threats.

From October 2009-September 2020 she was the Global Director of the PREDICT Project, a more than $200 million viral emergence early-warning project that was developed with the United States Agency for International Development’s (USAID) Emerging Pandemic Threats Program. She was also the Director of the One Health Workforce – Next Generation project from October 2019-April 2021.

Mazet was born and raised in Marin County, California and currently lives both there and in Davis, California, USA with her husband. She has two daughters.

== Education and early career ==
Mazet earned her Bachelor of Science in Veterinary Medicine from the University of California, Davis in 1990 and her Master of Preventive Veterinary Medicine in Wildlife and Infectious Disease and her Doctor of Veterinary Medicine in 1992. In 1996, she completed a PhD in epidemiology, expanding her training across human and animal species divides.

Mazet worked as a wildlife veterinarian for the California Department of Fish and Wildlife where she was instrumental in the development of California’s Oiled Wildlife Care Network (OWCN). While working as an oil spill responder, she advanced the collaborative Network, making it a model for wildlife emergency management systems worldwide, and remains a consulting expert on animal emergency preparedness and response.

She joined the faculty of the UC Davis School of Veterinary Medicine in 1998 and became Co-director of the fledgling Wildlife Health Center and moved the headquarters of the OWCN to the university.

In 2009, she became Executive Director of the newly formed UC Davis One Health Institute, which is home to programs and projects that do work around the world, including the Karen C. Drayer Wildlife Health Center, PREDICT Project, Gorilla Doctors, SeaDoc Society, EpiCenter for Disease Dynamics and the California Raptor Center.

== Viral discovery and pandemic preparedness ==
Prior to the COVID-19 pandemic, Mazet gave more than 65 Keynote & Invited presentations across national and international assemblies. Since the onset of the pandemic, Dr. Mazet is frequently asked to speak about and consult on matters related to pandemics. She has been a strong advocate for mobilizing university networks in pandemic preparedness.

Under Mazet’s leadership, the Grand Challenges team at the University of California, Davis has established a transdisciplinary program in Emerging Health Threats to champion multisectoral engagement and emerging science and technological innovations across entities to better prepare for and even prevent the next pandemic. Toward this effort, and using the rich data derived from the PREDICT Project, Mazet has led the SpillOver project for viral risk ranking to estimate the likeliness of pathogen spillover between animals and humans. In collaboration with the Coalition for Epidemic Preparedness Innovation (CEPI), the UC Davis SpillOvers team has expanded the virus risk ranking using machine learning methods to identify virus families most likely to emerge as the next Disease X with pandemic potential.

Prior to the Grand Challenges initiative, Mazet was Principal Investigator and Global Director of USAID’s PREDICT Project, which worked in more than 30 countries to build capacity to develop surveillance systems and complete the necessary research to halt the next pandemic, like influenza, SARS, Ebola, and HIV. With these projects and others as a research foundation, she has served as the mentor for over 80 graduate student and postdoctoral trainees. She also co-authored the following recent publications: The discovery of Bombali virus adds further support for bats as hosts of ebolaviruses (Nature Microbiology) and The Global Virome Project (Science).

== Honors and awards ==
2023 – American Veterinary Epidemiology Society’s K. F. Meyer/James H. Steele Gold-Headed Cane

2021 Global Landscape Forum’s 16 Women Restoring the Earth

2021 – 2021 AVMA Global Veterinary Service Award

2020 – UC Davis Chancellor’s Award for International Engagement

2020 – Global Aggie

2018 – Shattuck Lecturer invited by the New England Journal of Medicine and the Massachusetts Medical Society

2018 – TEDMED Hive Innovator for Global Virome Project (TEDMED speaker)

2018 – Holbrook Lecturer, Children's National Health System

2017 – Fellow, American Association for the Advancement of Science (AAAS)

2017 – Honorable Mention, Remarkable Women of UC, University of California

2017 – Inaugural Hall-Sewankambo Mid-Career Global Health Award, Consortium of Universities for Global Health

2017 – Alumni Achievement Award, UC Davis School of Veterinary Medicine

2016 – Leiter Lecturer, National Library of Medicine (NIH) and National Medical Library Association

2016 – Schofield Metal, Ontario Veterinary College, University of Guelph

2016 – Zoetis Award for Veterinary Research Excellence

2015 – George C. Poppensiek Visiting Professor in Global Animal Health, Cornell University

2015 – American Veterinary Epidemiology Society Honorary Diplomate

2014 – R.G. Thomson Lecturer, Atlantic Veterinary College, University of Prince Edward Island (Canada)

2013 – Elected to the National Academy of Medicine (formerly Institute of Medicine)

2012 – Oscar W. Schalm Lecturer, University of California, Davis

2012 – Outstanding Alumna Award, University of California, Davis

2011 – International Wildlife Disease Association and American Association of Wildlife Veterinarians Joint Tom Thorne and Beth Williams Memorial Award – Most significant contribution to the field of wildlife health

2004 – Appointed to Governor of California’s Oil Spill Technical Advisory Committee
