= California Raptor Center =

- Organization Logo
- Founded: 1972
- Type: Wildlife rehabilitation and education
- Location: Davis, California
- Coordinates: 38°31′04″N 121°45′09″W
- Parent organization: UC Davis School of Veterinary Medicine
- Website: crc.vetmed.ucdavis.edu

The California Raptor Center (CRC) is a rehabilitation, education, and research facility for birds of prey, affiliated with the University of California, Davis School of Veterinary Medicine. Located in Davis, California, the center is dedicated to the care of injured and orphaned raptors, as well as public outreach on raptor ecology and conservation, and research on birds of prey. The CRC is authorized through the United States Fish and Wildlife Service and the California Department of Fish and Wildlife.

== History ==
The CRC was founded in 1972 by UC Davis faculty member Dr. Frank Ogasawara, falconers Mark Fenn and Ole Torgerson, graduate student Alida Morzenti, and various undergraduate students. With the help of the California Department of Fish and Game they began taking in and rehabilitating injured and orphaned birds of prey. They moved to their current location in 1974. In 1980, the UC Davis School of Veterinary Medicine partnered with the CRC to provide advanced medical care to injured birds.

Originally the CRC only offered private tours. However in 1992 they opened to the public for self-guided tours during operation ours. They host over 1,000 visitors weekly who can view various species of permanent resident birds on display for educational purposes, as well as a museum that houses various taxidermied animals and interactive exhibits for children. Today the center has grown into a large scale facility for both rehabilitation and education related to birds of prey.

In 2025, the CRC announced a collaboration with the UC Davis Arboretum and Public Garden to construct a new educational enclosure for ambassador raptors. The planned habitat will allow visitors to observe birds of prey in a naturalistic setting while expanding opportunities for conservation education.

== Management and funding ==
The Raptor Center is provided administrative support by the UC Davis School of Veterinary Medicine, however it is primarily funded by public donations. These donations fund raptor food, veterinary care, building and cage construction, and all other operational costs. The center is operated using volunteers who care for the grounds and the birds. About 7,000 volunteer labor hours are provided annually. It is managed by a director as well as on site managers of operations.

== Rehabilitation ==
The center admits approximately 100 to 200 raptors annually, including hawks, owls, falcons, vultures, and eagles. About 60 percent of these birds are successfully treated and released back into the wild. Animals requiring advanced medical care are referred to the UC Davis Veterinary Medical Teaching Hospital, after which they continue recovery and flight conditioning at the CRC. When they are able to return to their wild habitat they are released near the sites they were taken.

== Education and outreach ==
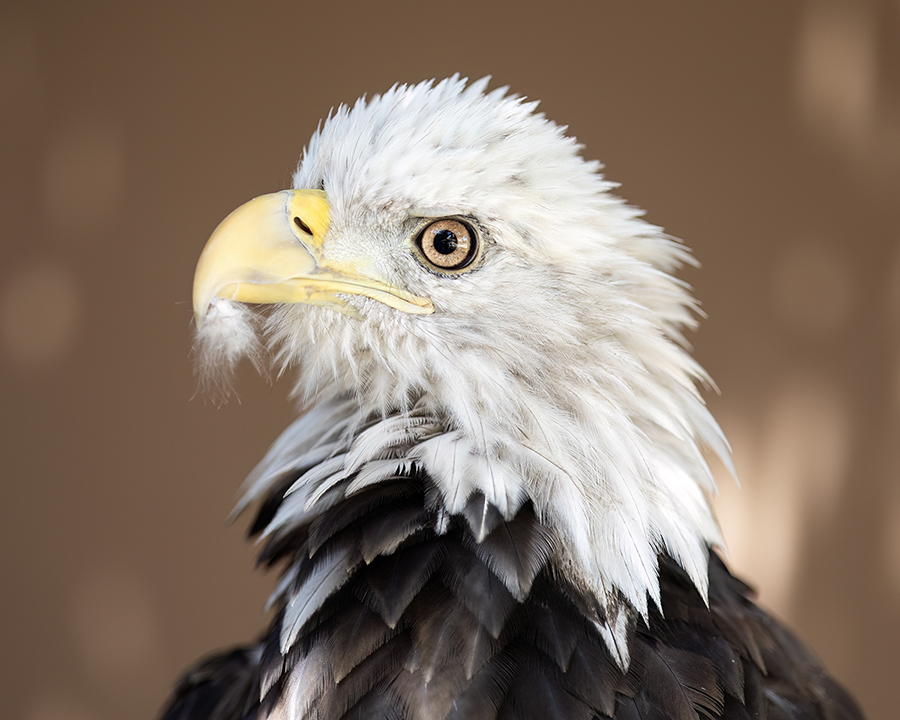
Sul Wita the bald eagle. One of the ambassador education birds at the CRC. His name means "Eagle Man" in Patwin.

One of the goals of the center is to encourage education related to raptors to encourage appreciation and respect for these birds and their habitats. The CRC maintains a collection of non-releasable "ambassador" raptors, which are permanently housed at the facility. These birds have some permanent condition that prevents them from being released into the wild. Ambassador birds are used in educational programs for schools, clubs, and community organizations.

Guided tours and off-site presentations are offered, and self-guided visits are available during open hours. Admission is free, though donations support the facility’s operations.

== Research and training ==
As part of the UC Davis School of Veterinary Medicine, the CRC supports research in avian medicine, wildlife biology, and conservation. Veterinary students and residents gain hands-on experience in raptor care, while faculty and researchers use the facility to study raptor health and rehabilitation outcomes. In 2025, CRC director Dr. Michelle Hawkins co-authored a study published in the American Journal of Veterinary Research on chlamydial infections in free-ranging raptors admitted to the university’s veterinary hospital over several decades.

In 2024, the CRC partnered with the School of Veterinary Medicine and faculty in the UC Davis Department of Mechanical and Aerospace Engineering to establish a bird flight research facility funded by a nearly US$3 million grant from the United States Department of Defense. The project employs motion capture and photogrammetry to create three-dimensional models of raptor flight, with applications in uncrewed aerial system design and rehabilitation techniques.

== See also ==
- UC Davis School of Veterinary Medicine
- Wildlife rehabilitation
