= One Health Institute =

- Founded: 2009
- Purpose: One Health, global health, infectious disease, wildlife veterinary medicine
- Location: University of California, Davis, California, US
- Region served: Worldwide
- Director: Dr. Michael Ziccardi
- Website: ohi.vetmed.ucdavis.edu

The One Health Institute works at the interface of animals, people, plants, and the environment to solve complex problems that impact health and conservation around the world. The institute is part of the UC Davis School of Veterinary Medicine and is home to the Karen C. Drayer Wildlife Health Center and many other programs and projects. The executive director of the One Health Institute is Dr. Michael Ziccardi. The One Health approach recognizes that the health of domestic animals, wildlife, and people are inextricably linked to one another and the environment.

== Notable programs and projects ==
- One Health Workforce - Next Generation: A project that "promotes global health security by empowering One Health University Networks in Africa and Southeast Asia to build the human resources and bolster the workforce for more effective disease surveillance and control."
- Karen C. Drayer Wildlife Health Center: A Center that improves the health of wildlife in balance with people and the environment. Its projects and programs focus on issues involving free-ranging and captive terrestrial and aquatic wild animals. Many other programs and projects are housed within the Wildlife Health Center.
- Disaster Preparedness & Response Programs:
  - Oiled Wildlife Care Network: A California program that works to rescue and rehabilitate oiled wildlife through a statewide collective of trained care providers, regulatory agencies and academic institutions.
  - California Veterinary Emergency Team (CVET)
  - Wildlife Disaster Network
- Gorilla Doctors: A donor-funded program that provides hands-on medical care to sick and injured mountain gorillas living in the national parks of Rwanda, Uganda, and the Democratic Republic of Congo.
- SeaDoc Society: A program that works to protect the health of marine wildlife and their ecosystems through science and education in the Pacific Northwest.
- One Health Institute Lab: A laboratory that functions as a service facility for the Marine Mammal Health and Stranding Response Program and as the central research facility for the PREDICT project, which aims to halt emerging diseases of pandemic potential.
- California Raptor Center: A Center that rescues and rehabilitates injured and orphaned birds of prey while also working to educate the public on the importance of raptors and advance research to improve species health and survival.
- UC Global Health Institute's Planetary Health Center of Expertise: A Center that "addresses complex global issues that arise from the effects of climate change, rapidly growing populations and limited food and natural resources and draws on the resources of all ten UC campuses and two national laboratories."
- EpiCenter for Disease Dynamics: A Center that uses sophisticated analytical tools to evaluate underlying mechanisms and move closer to an applied forecasting system for emerging diseases.
- PREEMPT: A project that aims to predict the emergence of highly pathogenic viruses in animals, and then preventing them from spilling over to humans altogether using strategies that include a novel animal vaccine.
- More - Other programs and projects include California Wildlife Conservation, the Calvin Schwabe Project, Zoological Medicine Program, the Latin America Program, and more.

== Legacy projects ==
- PREDICT: A USAID-funded project that provides global surveillance to detect and prevent spillover of pathogens of pandemic potential that can move between wildlife and people.
  - SpillOver: open-source web application developed by One Health Institute infectious disease scientists and the PREDICT initiative, launched in 2021 during the COVID-19 pandemic as a virus and host risk assessment tool
- Health for Animals and Livelihood Improvement Project (HALI): A collaborative U.S.-Tanzania research and capacity-building program that assesses the effects of zoonotic disease and water management on health and livelihoods in the Ruaha ecosystem of Tanzania.
