= Predict (USAID) =

U.S. funded virus research program

- Project type: Epidemiological research
- Funding agency: United States Agency for International Development
- Objective: Early warning pandemic system
- Project coordinator: One Health Institute
- Partners: EcoHealth Alliance; Metabiota; Wildlife Conservation Society; Smithsonian Institution
- Budget: Funding: $200 million
- Duration: 2009 – 2020
- Website: predict.edu

Predict was an epidemiological research program funded by a United States Agency for International Development (USAID) grant and led by UC Davis' One Health Institute. Launched in 2009, the program was described as an early warning pandemic system.

== History ==
Predict was launched in 2009 in response following the influenza A virus subtype H5N1 "bird flu" outbreak in 2005. It was designed and overseen by Dennis Carroll, who was the director of the USAID emerging threats division at the time, along with epidemiologist Jonna Mazet as its global director. The program was one of four projects within USAID's Emerging Pandemic Threats program.

From 2009 to 2019, Predict collected over 140,000 biological samples from various animals (potential reservoirs), including over 10,000 bats and 2,000 other mammals. Research teams of epidemiologists and wildlife veterinarian identified some 1,200 viruses with the potential to cause human disease and pandemics, including over 160 novel coronaviruses. The virus-hunting focused on "hot interfaces"—areas with high biodiversity, dense human populations, and environmental conditions which were conducive to the spread of disease and where human-animal interaction was high. Predict worked in regions such as the Amazon Basin, South and Southeast Asia, and the Congo Basin.

The approach of virus hunting by Predict and other agencies was criticized as ineffective in comparison to human surveillance as a way to prevent pandemics. One virologist noted that cataloguing viruses was not enough, as spillover infections were often unexpected and difficult to predict. Also, viruses mutate quickly, making some die out while others can mutate to new hosts.

Efforts by Predict resulted in the discovery of a new kind of Ebolavirus: Bombali ebolavirus.

Predict partnered with EcoHealth Alliance for its work.

== Funding and closure ==
Predict operated on five-year funding cycles, receiving about $200 million over the course of its decade in operation. Fieldwork ceased at the end of September 2019 after funding ran out, and the program was ended in March 2020 by the Trump administration, which has also cut funding for other global health security programs.

In January 2020, Senators Angus King and Elizabeth Warren criticized the shutdown of Predict, writing in a letter: "The rise of 2019-nCoV heightens the need for a robust, coordinated, and proactive response to emerging pandemics – one of the roles that PREDICT played." The senators wrote that the spread of the coronavirus disease 2019 (which is caused by 2019-nCoV) "threatens public health in the U.S. and abroad" and said that programs like Predict should be ramping up rather than shutting down.

On April 1, 2020, following the beginning of the COVID-19 pandemic in the United States, USAID granted $2.26 million to the program for a six-month emergency extension; the UC Davis announcement said that the extension would support "detection of SARS CoV-2 cases in Africa, Asia and the Middle East to inform the public health response" and investigation of "the animal source or sources of SARS CoV-2 using data and samples collected over the past 10 years in Asia and Southeast Asia".

== See also ==
- Disease X
- Cross-species transmission
- Zoonosis
