= SeaDoc Society =

American nonprofit marine organization

- Formation: 1999; 27 years ago
- Founded: 2000
- Tax ID no.: 94-6036494
- Purpose: Marine science, education, wildlife conservation, One Health
- Location: Orcas Island, Washington
- Region served: Salish Sea
- Website: https://www.seadocsociety.org/

SeaDoc Society is a nonprofit marine science organization based on Orcas Island, Washington. They work to ensure the health of marine wildlife and their ecosystems through science and education. SeaDoc Society is a program of the Karen C. Drayer Wildlife Health Center at the UC Davis School of Veterinary Medicine.

They fund and conduct research and produce a wildlife web series called Salish Sea Wild and a podcast called Pod of Orcas. Their work has also lead to community outreach including plans to address oil spills and its effects on marine life.
