= Tioman virus =

Virus classification
- (unranked): Virus
- Realm: Riboviria
- Kingdom: Orthornavirae
- Phylum: Negarnaviricota
- Class: Monjiviricetes
- Order: Mononegavirales
- Family: Paramyxoviridae
- Genus: Pararubulavirus
- Species: Tioman pararubulavirus

Species of virus

Tioman virus is a paramyxovirus first isolated from the urine of island fruit bats (Pteropus hypomelanus) on Tioman Island, Malaysia in 2000. The virus was discovered during efforts to identify the natural host of Nipah virus which was responsible for a large outbreak of encephalitic illness in humans and pigs in Malaysia and Singapore in 1998–99.

== Taxonomy ==
Tioman virus is antigenically related to Menangle virus which is also harboured by Pteropid fruit bats and caused an outbreak of foetal deformities in pigs in Australia in 1997.

== Clinical importance ==
Although there is no evidence that Tioman virus can cause illness in humans or animals, its close relationship to other disease-causing paramyxoviruses (Hendra virus, Menangle virus, Nipah virus) suggests the possibility that it may cause disease upon crossing the species barrier. The recent emergence of a number of zoonotic bat-borne viruses in the Asia-Pacific region also demonstrates that conditions are increasingly favouring this type of event.
