= Miguel Altieri =

Chilean agronomist and entomologist

- Education: Bachelor's degree in agronomy, University of Chile; PhD in entomology, University of Florida
- Occupations: Professor of Agroecology, University of California, Berkeley in the Department of Environmental Science, Policy and Management
- Known for: Agroecology, agroforestry and urban agriculture

Miguel Altieri is a Chilean born agronomist and entomologist. He is a Professor of Agroecology at the University of California, Berkeley in the Department of Environmental Science, Policy and Management.

== Career ==
Miguel Altieri studied agronomy at the University of Chile, where he received a bachelor's degree. He graduated with a Ph.D. in entomology at the University of Florida. In 1981 he became Professor of agroecology at the University of California, Berkeley in the Department of Environmental Science, Policy and Management.

He has been teaching courses in agroecology, agroforestry and urban agriculture. He is an advocate of sustainable agriculture and is highly critical of large agribusiness corporations such as Cargill, Monsanto, and ADM. He has conducted most of his research in California and Chile working closely with farmers and workers to implement principles of integrated pest management, intercropping, cover cropping, crop-field border vegetation manipulation, and other sustainable practices of biological control.

Altieri served as a Scientific Advisor to the Latin American Consortium on Agroecology and Development (CLADES) Chile, an NGO network promoting agroecology as a strategy for small farm sustainable development in the region. He also served for 4 years as the General Coordinator for the United Nations Development Programme’s Sustainable Agriculture Networking and Extension Programme which aimed at capacity building on agroecology among NGOs and the scaling-up of successful local sustainable agricultural initiatives in Africa, Latin America and Asia. He was the chairman of the NGO committee of the Consultative Group on International Agriculture Research whose mission was to make sure that the research agenda of the 15 International Agricultural Research Centers benefited poor farmers. He was Director of the US-Brasil Consortium on Agroecology and Sustainable Rural Development (CASRD), an academic-research exchange program involving students and faculty of UC Berkeley, University of Nebraska, UNICAMP and Universidad Federal de Santa Catarina. As of 2011 he has been advisor to the Food and Agriculture Organization Globally Important Agricultural Heritage Systems (GIAHS) program, which is devoted at identifying and dynamically conserving traditional farming systems in the developing world. He is the President of the Latin American Scientific Society of Agroecology. In 2012, he supported farming the Gill Tract, a UC owned part of land. in 2017, he became Honorary Professor of the University of La Frontera

== Publications ==
Altieri is the author of more than 200 publications, and more than a dozen books including Agroecology: The Science of Sustainable Agriculture (1987, 1995, 2018), Biodiversity and pest management in agroecosystems (1994, 2004) and Agroecology and the Search for a Truly Sustainable Agriculture (with Clara I. Nicholls, 2005).

- The significance of diversity in the maintenance of the sustainability of traditional agro-ecosystems ILEIA Newsletter, 3.2, July 1987
- SOCLA’s Ph.D. programme: A new cadre of scientists-activists Farming Matters, 29.3, September 2013
- Agro-ecological approaches to enhance resilience LEISA India, 14.2, June 2012
- Managing pests through plant diversification LEISA Magazine, 22.4, December 2006
