= Wildlife Disaster Network =

American wildlife rescue organization

- Abbreviation: WDN
- Formation: October 2020; 6 years ago
- Purpose: Wildlife rescue and rehabilitation
- Key people: Jamie Peyton; Eric Johnson; Deana Clifford; Michael Ziccardi
- Affiliations: UC Davis School of Veterinary Medicine; Karen C. Drayer Wildlife Health Center / Oiled Wildlife Care Network (OWCN); Wildlife Health Lab (California Department of Fish and Wildlife)
- Website: ohi.vetmed.ucdavis.edu/disaster-preparedness-response/wdn

The Wildlife Disaster Network (WDN) is an American organization focusing on aiding wild animals suffering due to natural disasters.

== History ==
The WDN was created in October 2020, as a partnership between the California Department of Fish and Wildlife and the UC Davis School of Veterinary Medicine. The network is made up of rehabilitation centers, veterinarians, trained animal care volunteers, wildlife biologists and ecologists.

It was modelled after the Oiled Wildlife Care Network, which was started at UC Davis for rescuing birds and other marine animals from oil spills. It is led by Jamie Peyton, Eric Johnson, Deana Clifford and Michael Ziccardi.

In 2021, it was one of 29 recipients of a US$1,000,000 grant from the Dave and Cheryl Duffield Foundation to rescue and rehabilitate animals injured by the Caldor Fire.

== Activities ==
The network operates a hotline where they receive calls from people who find injured wild animals. It then requests authorization from officials to rescue the animals, who after being found are captured and transported to rescue facilities where they receive care for their injuries.
