= Ben Weston (physician) =

American physician

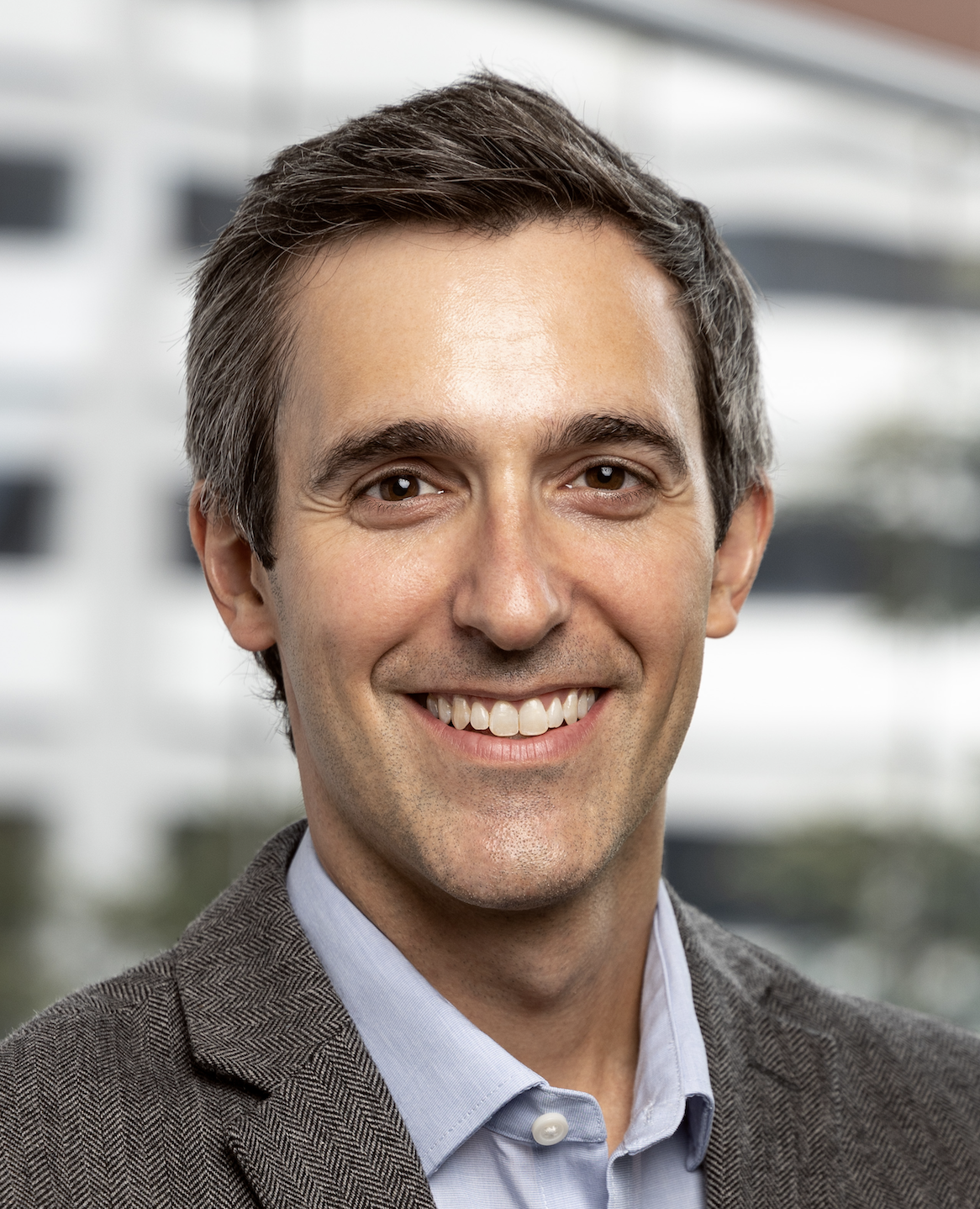
- Born: Milwaukee

Academic background
- Education: BA, Biology, 2005, Lawrence University; MPH, 2010, MD, 2011, University of Wisconsin School of Medicine and Public Health

Benjamin Weston is an American physician. While serving as an associate professor of Emergency Medicine at the Medical College of Wisconsin, Weston is also the Director of medical services for the Office of Emergency Management and the Chief Health Policy Advisor for Milwaukee County. Weston's research interests include prehospital care, resuscitation, health equity, and public health surveillance.

== Early life and education ==
Weston was raised in Milwaukee where his first job was working concessions at Uihlein Soccer Park. He received his Bachelor of Arts degree in biology at Lawrence University in 2005. During his undergraduate studies, Weston organized an abs class that met three times a week in order to combat obesity. He also worked in various residence hall leadership positions and chaired the Lawrence University Community Council's Judicial Board.

Upon graduating with his baccalaureate degree, Weston simultaneously earned his medical degree and master of public health from the University of Wisconsin School of Medicine and Public Health. He also co-founded the Healthy Classrooms Foundation to "bring public health to the public" in 2008. Weston then completed his emergency medicine residency at Hennepin County Medical Center and completed his Emergency Medical Services Fellowship at the Medical College of Wisconsin (MCW).

== Career ==
During the COVID-19 pandemic, Weston promoted the vaccine and combated COVID-19 misinformation. He helped create the county's online COVID-19 dashboard to track cases, hospitalizations, deaths, and other data to inform the public and shape decision-making. As a result of his advocacy, Weston was selected as a member of the Milwaukee Business Journal’s 40 Under 40 2021 class. In August 2021, Weston was appointed by Milwaukee County Executive David Crowley as Milwaukee County's inaugural Chief Health Policy Advisor. When speaking of the promotion, Crowley stated that Weston's expertise will help "inform strategies and programs that further advance our health and equity goals and bring us closer to our vision of being the healthiest county in the state." He was later named one of three recipients of the 2021 Milwaukee Business Journal's Health Care Champion. In August 2022, Weston was selected by the National Academy of Medicine (NAM) to serve as the NAM Fellow to Advance State Health Policy.

== Personal life ==
Weston and his wife Michelle, a fellow physician, have three children together.
