= Gill Tract =

The Gill Tract is 104 acres of land in Berkeley and Albany, California that the regents of the University of California purchased from the family of the late Edward Gill in 1928. As of 2021, the land is used for UC Berkeley housing, an elementary school, public fields, a community garden, and agricultural research plots.

== Historical Overview ==
In 1939 about 16 acres of the tract was granted to the federal government for a United States Department of Agriculture research campus, and in 1945 another 36 acres were conveyed as an agricultural experiment field station.

During World War II the federal government requisitioned most of the Gill Tract, along with a larger amount of land in the City of Berkeley, for construction of housing for families of civilian defense industry workers and of U.S. Navy personnel. Following World War II this project, known as Codornices Village, was converted to housing for families of U.C. Berkeley students, many of whom were war veterans.

University Village, a housing community for UC Berkeley students who are married or have dependents, occupies 52.5 of the original 104 acres. A nine-acre portion is the current site of Ocean View Elementary School and public baseball fields.

Urban gardening plots are available to University Village residents on 6.6 acres at the western edge of the Gill Tract. Ten acres of arable, undeveloped land are used for urban agriculture and agricultural experimentation and research; bound by Buchanan St. to the north, Village Creek to the south, Jackson St. to the west, and San Pablo Ave. to the east.

Four acres of trees and grasses known as Albany Meadows, formerly University Village residential buildings, serve as part of a wildlife corridor in the East Bay. The remaining six acres held facilities for agricultural experimentation and student residential buildings until their demolition in 2007. These two areas; bound by Village creek to the north, Codornices creek to the south, San Pablo Avenue to the east, and Jackson Street to the west, are included in a plan for commercial development by the University of California, Berkeley.

The history of the development of the Gill Tract has been described extensively in A Selective History of the Codornices-University Village, the City of Albany and Environs by Warren F. Lee and Catherine T. Lee, published in 2000 by the Belvidere Delaware Railroad Co. Enterprises, Ltd.

=== Pre-Colonial ===
The land now known as the Gill Tract lays within the territory of native Ohlone people.

=== Spanish Colonial ===
On August 3, 1820 Luis María Peralta received a Spanish land grant that included the acreage at Gill Tract.

=== Post–Mexican-American War ===
Sometime after the 1848 Mexican–American War, a person by the name of Captain B.D. Boswell assumed ownership of land that includes today's Gill Tract. This Captain Boswell then sold the piece of land to its namesake, Edward Gill, around 1890. Edward Gill, a horticulturalist, built a home on the land and established a large nursery, which he operated until his death in 1909. Gill's son continued to operate the nursery until he sold his father's land to the University.

=== Sale to University of California ===
On February 14, 1928, the regents of the University of California purchased the 104 acre Gill Tract for $450,000.

=== World War II – Federal government development of public housing (Codornices Village) ===
In 1943 the federal government announced to local officials its plan to requisition a portion of the Gill Tract to construct wartime housing. The announcement of this plan was opposed by political and business leaders in Berkeley and Albany, as well as some regents of the University of California. City officials opposed the potential loss of tax-revenue to public housing; the university regents opposed the loss of a portion of the Gill Tract from their control.

John Blanford, administrator of the National Public Housing Authority, pushed through the plan (War Housing Project No. CAL 4479) with the assurance that, under the Lanham Act, within two years after the end of the war emergency the land would be returned to the university in the same condition that it was received.

Construction by the Federal Housing Authority of Codornices Village began by October 1943. John Melville, the first on-site manager of Codornices Village, stressed that no racial restrictions would apply to applicants for housing. Beginning in May 1944 housing in Codornices Village was made available to families of civilian workers in wartime industries, including Black migratory workers from the South as well as caucasian workers. In July housing was opened to families of U.S. Navy personnel. All of the social services in the village were racially integrated from the onset, two decades before the civil rights movement. These services included child-care centers, an elementary school (Codornices School), and a church. Codornices School, part of the Albany School District, served both Albany and Berkeley residents.

By August 1944 Codornices Village comprised 1,896 residential units; 1,056 units were located on 75 acres of the Gill Tract (15 city blocks) within the City of Berkeley, while the remainder were located on 42 acres of the tract within the City of Albany. The initial unit rental charges, including all furnishings and utilities, were $31.50 per month for a studio, $36 a month for a one bedroom, $42.50 a month for a two bedroom, and $47 for three bedrooms.

Throughout World War II the majority of civilian war workers in Codornices Village worked as shipbuilders at Mare Island, while another large portion of residents were Navy personnel who worked at the nearby Naval Landing Force Equipment Depot adjacent to the Albany Bulb.

=== Post World War II ===
In the Spring of 1946 the Federal Housing Authority disassembled nine two-story fourteen-unit apartment buildings in Oregon and reassembled them in Albany on the Gill Tract near the intersections of Jackson and Buchanan Streets. The project was known as Albany Veterans Village at Gill Court, and became the home to veterans and their families from its opening on November 15, 1946 until June 1959, when it was demolished due to health and maintenance concerns.

Additionally, the US Navy constructed a complex of fourteen apartment-buildings on the Gill Tract by March 1945. This one-hundred-unit development, known as the Kula Gulf Navy housing project, was home to Navy Veterans and combat personnel and their families.

On June 28, 1948, President Harry S. Truman signed the McGregor Act, which allowed the Federal Housing Authority to relinquish its portion of Gill Tract to the University of California. On October 31, 1948, the Albany City Council transferred ownership of the nine buildings and furnishings that comprised the Albany Veterans Village back to the University of California.

=== University Village ===
On April 15, 1956, the UC Regents purchased 40 buildings of the portion of the Codornices Village located on Gill Tract and 14 buildings that comprised the Kula Gulf Veterans Housing from the Federal Housing Authority for $44,000. One week after this purchase the business manager for UC Berkeley, William W. Monham, recommended that the entirety of the married-student housing project be known as University Village. On April 30, 1956 the name change was approved by President Robert Sproul.

In September, 1963, the UC Regents sold 2.7 acres of the Gill Tract near Buchanan and San Pablo to Albany for the connection of Marin Avenue to Buchanan and for the police station, fire department and city hall buildings.

In 1973, the UC Regents sold 5.1 acres of the Gill Tract to the Albany school district for the construction of Albany Middle School near the current site of Oceanview school.

University Village continues today as a housing community for UC Berkeley students who are married or have dependents.

A study on the Village Residents Association found that 46% of residents utilize food assistance programs. This is one of the reasons students and others hope to maintain this space as farm land.

=== 2010s Development ===
In 2017, a development including a Sprouts grocery store and a retirement home was completed.

== Urban agriculture ==
Beginning in 1969, plots for urban agriculture were available to residents of the University Village. Until 1975 the University would provide irrigation and an annual till free of charge. In 1979, a 12 x 20 foot plot cost $1 per year. By 1984 a plot cost $5 tilled, and $2 without a till. By 1990 and thereafter, the charge for a plot was $10 for the first one and $5 for each additional one. Hoses and water were always provided free of charge and a till cost $8 per plot.

Today, small plots for urban agriculture are available exclusively to University Village residents on 6.6 acres at the western edge of the Gill Tract.

The Gill Tract has a focus on agroecological principles, agroecosystem research, food justice, political education, and other farm management activities. The Gill Tract utilizes democratic and collaborative decision making, utilizing participatory consensus, a Stewardship Council, specialized working groups, consultation with local indigenous-led groups, and other collaborative processes to facilitate community participation.

The farm hosts a sliding-scale farmstand and has partnerships with other organizations in the East Bay. In 2018, the Gill Tract began collaborating with the Sogorea Te' Land Trust in order to address land-use and rematriation (see: repatriation) processes.

=== Agricultural research ===
Since 1944, 36 acres of the Gill Tract were used as an experiment station for Biological Pest Management; known as the Experiment Station for the Center for Biological Control in the College of Natural Resources. In 1998, experimental land for the Center for Biological Control was drastically limited in order to accommodate epigenetic research of non-GMO corn to patent genes for the genetic modification of organisms.

August 10, 2013 marked the beginning of a participatory research project between UC professor Miguel Altieri and forty participants from surrounding neighborhoods. The participants split into ten groups of four and each managed a small plot of land as part of a competition to see which group could grow the most pounds of food per square foot.

Currently, a community farm on the Northwest corner of the Gill Tract is open to the public to participate in agroecological urban farming research.

=== Occupy the Farm ===
Occupy the Farm, also called "take back the tract", has been a social movement that started with the 2012 occupation of the Gill Tract in Albany, California, in protest of planned commercial development of public land and in support of preserving the land for the creation of an open center for urban agroecology and food sovereignty.
