= UC Davis School of Veterinary Medicine =

Veterinary school in California

Coordinates: 38.538703°N 121.761713°W

The University of California, Davis, School of Veterinary Medicine is one of the largest veterinary schools in the United States, with approximately 700 students and 250 faculty members. Established in 1948, the school is the primary health resource for California's animal populations. In 2020, the school was again ranked first in the United States by U.S. News & World Report and in 2022, ranked second in the world by the QS World University Rankings. The school is located in the southwest corner of the main campus of the University of California, Davis. The current dean of veterinary medicine is Dr. Mark Stetter.

The school focuses on students of the professional Doctor of Veterinary Medicine program, the Master of Preventive Veterinary Medicine program, graduate clinical residency programs, and graduate academic MS and PhD programs. The School of Veterinary Medicine provides educational, research, clinical service, and public service programs to advance the health and care of animals, the health of the environment, and public health.

The school addresses the health of all animals, including livestock, poultry, companion animals, captive and free-ranging wildlife, exotic animals, birds, aquatic mammals and fish, and animals used in biological and medical research. The school's expertise also encompasses related human health concerns, such as public health and the concept of One Health.

The school runs 28 research and clinical programs, including clinical referral services; diagnostic testing services; continuing education; extension; and community outreach.

== History ==
=== The UC affiliates ===
The current school is the University of California's second attempt at a veterinary school. It was also the first professional school to open at the Davis campus.

As originally enacted in 1868, Section 8 of the university's Organic Act authorized the Regents of the University of California to affiliate the university with independent self-sustaining professional colleges. One of the early UC affiliates was a College of Veterinary Medicine, which operated in San Francisco from 1894 to 1899. This college graduated only 10 students before it collapsed due to private competition, meager enrollments, and lack of financial support.

=== The birth of the school ===
In 1901, the College of Agriculture at Berkeley established a Division of Veterinary Science which hired veterinarians to conduct research on livestock and poultry diseases. As early as 1920, one of them, Clarence M. Haring, recommended the creation of a veterinary school. His proposal went nowhere and all veterinarians in California continued to be trained outside of the state.

In 1938, the American Veterinary Medical Association (AVMA) and the California Veterinary Medical Association both conducted studies which focused public attention on the need for more veterinary schools in the Western United States. Of the ten veterinary schools in North America at that time, only one was west of the Rocky Mountains—Washington State—while four were concentrated in the Northeastern United States. This distribution made no sense since veterinarians were needed for the large livestock and poultry populations of the western states.

In 1939, state senator John Phillips of Banning introduced a bill to create a veterinary school which promptly died and never passed. Eventually R. Vince Garrod, chair of the State Board of Agriculture, started to rally support for the idea that California needed its own veterinary school. Garrod Drive (now the school's main access road) is named in his honor. On January 7, 1941, Assemblyman Charles Stream of Chula Vista introduced Assembly Bill 15 (coauthored with Hugh M. Burns), which proposed to appropriate $1 million to establish a public veterinary school. It was signed into state law by Governor Culbert Olson on July 9, 1941.

The entrance of the United States into World War II in December 1941 caused the Board of Regents to put the launch of the school on hold in February 1942. In the meantime, there was a brief debate over where to put the school, but Davis won out over the Berkeley campus and the Gill Tract because it had plenty of room for expansion and had already gained a strong reputation for excellence in animal sciences. On May 26, 1944, the Board of Regents voted in favor of Davis and to also transfer there Berkeley's existing veterinary science research.

Haring served as chairman of the curriculum committee to create the degree requirements for the new school. Although he was on the brink of retirement, he was appointed as the school's first dean effective July 1, 1947.

On April 18, 1948, groundbreaking took place for the veterinary school's first building, followed by the first classes in temporary facilities that September. The original entering class consisted of 42 men and were mostly war veterans. The second entering class had 52 members, of which two were women. Meanwhile, Haring became ill after only one year and retired, and was succeeded as dean by George H. Hart, who served from 1948 to 1954. The vet school's original building was later renamed Haring Hall in honor of its founding dean, while George Hart Hall was renamed in honor of its second dean.

Hart's management style was "authoritarian", and he focused primarily on biomedical science research over other disciplines . He also led the school's move into its new building upon completion. Haring Hall was more richly appointed than other buildings at the Davis campus at the time. Faculty in other Davis units enviously called it the "marble palace" or the "horse pentagon".

=== Transformation and growth ===
Donald E. Jasper succeeded Hart as dean in 1954. In response to widespread criticism of the school's "lack of clinical focus", Jasper sought to improve the school's teaching and clinical programs. He also supervised the creation of the department of veterinary clinical pathology and the program in veterinary hematology, both the first of their kind in the world. In 1962, shortly before Jasper returned to teaching and research, the AVMA's Council on Education granted full accreditation to the school.

William R. Pritchard served as dean from 1962 to 1982. He led the expansion of the school's mission beyond its original focus on agricultural animals to managing the health of "all the kinds of animals useful to people", as well as "control of animal diseases harmful to people".

The original building, Haring Hall, had been built to target an entering class size of 50 students, but by the 1960s, the building was severely overcrowded with four years of classes consisting of 80 students each. The school's main challenge during the 1960s was to develop a larger school building in a new health sciences complex in the southwest corner of the Davis campus, where it would be located near the new medical school and would share some facilities with that school. The veterinary school agreed to postpone its own building plans to synchronize its construction schedule with the planned medical school building and instead focused on renovating Haring Hall to better manage its overcrowding issues. The effort to develop a bigger building was further complicated by ongoing efforts in the 1960s by various Southern California politicians to establish a second public veterinary school at either the UC campuses at Irvine, Los Angeles, Riverside, or San Diego, or in the alternative, Cal Poly Pomona. Davis prevailed in fending off all these efforts; multiple UC studies repeatedly showed that two public veterinary schools in California would each remain too small to survive.

=== A new hospital and new programs ===
In 1967, the school began construction of the Veterinary Medicine Teaching Hospital (VMTH) near the planned health sciences complex. In 1969, the school's experimental animal facilities were greatly expanded with the completion of 13 new buildings. Meanwhile, Pritchard supervised the founding of several programs which were the first of their kind at a veterinary school anywhere in the world: epidemiology, preventive medicine, zoological medicine, neurology, ophthalmology, reproduction, and cardiology. Calvin Schwabe, the founding chair of the Department of Epidemiology and Preventive Medicine, developed the concept of One Medicine to reflect how human and animal medicine are tightly interlinked. The concept of One Medicine later evolved into One Health, which the school continues to support through its One Health Institute (founded in 2009).

In October 1970, the VMTH opened and began admitting patients. It was the only tertiary veterinary hospital in California and also "the nation's first primary, secondary, and tertiary animal care center at a veterinary school". It was a revolutionary new environment in which to teach veterinary medicine, which at Davis and other schools had been previously taught only in small primary-care practices attached to individual departments.

=== Escaping to the health sciences district from central campus ===
Like the medical school, the veterinary school's development of its physical facilities was derailed by the 1960s Berkeley protests, which alienated a large part of the California electorate from the University of California. Bond issues for the development of UC facilities were repeatedly defeated at the polls. The 1972 bond issue passed (of which one-third of the promised revenue was reserved to UC Davis), and it seemed as if the veterinary school would receive the $23 million promised for a Vet Med Unit II building in the campus's health sciences complex. However, in February 1973, surprise federal budget cuts forced the Davis campus administration to reassess priorities and the new veterinary school building was again indefinitely delayed. As a result of the delay, the school continued to operate the program out of various buildings scattered across the Davis campus over the next three decades. To manage overcrowding, the school was given some space in the medical school's new building and also part of the old facilities which the medical school had left behind. The additional space provided by the completion of the second VMTH building in 1979 allowed the school to expand the size of each entering class to 128.

In 1990, the school assured the AVMA ahead of its latest accreditation visit that the school's "highest priority" was building a new 400,000 square feet (37,000 m^{2}) school building next to the VMTH. As this promise was not fulfilled, in 1998 the AVMA awarded only two years of limited reaccreditation on the basis of a single issue: the poor quality of the school's physical facilities. U.S. News and World Report, which had routinely ranked the school as the no. 1 veterinary school in the nation for decades, dropped the school from its rankings pending reacquisition of full accreditation. This controversy forced the campus administration to prioritize the construction of a set of modern buildings to provide a suitable home for the school next to its teaching hospital.

Instead of one large building, the school proceeded to build a series of smaller buildings around the VMTH. In 2005, with several new buildings under construction, the AVMA restored the school to full accreditation. The school completed the last of these new buildings on March 28, 2017: a new Student Services and Administrative Center. This marked the completion of the school's long-planned separation from Haring Hall and adjacent buildings in the central campus area to the health sciences district in the southwest corner of campus.

== Departments ==
The school has six academic departments:

- Anatomy, Physiology & Cell Biology
- Molecular Biosciences
- Medicine and Epidemiology
- Pathology, Microbiology & Immunology
- Population Health and Reproduction
- Surgical and Radiological Sciences

The school switched to a new DVM curriculum starting with the class of 2015. This curriculum had been in development for 5 years. In the new curriculum, 75% of the material is didactic curriculum core material and 25% is elective material. In the first year, students gain a solid understanding of the normal structure, function and homeostasis of animals. Year two is focused on pathophysiology and mechanisms of disease of animals. The third year is aimed at teaching the manifestations of animal diseases including history, diagnosis, therapeutic and prevention strategies. The fourth year is clinical work, which is broken up into nine different tracks from which a student may choose. The tracks are Equine Track, Equine/Small Animal Track, Food Animal Track, Food/Small Animal Track, Large Animal Track, Mixed Animal Track, Small Animal Track, Zoological Track and Individual Track.

== Veterinary Medical Teaching Hospital ==
The William R. Pritchard Veterinary Medical Teaching Hospital (VMTH) at the University of California, Davis — a unit of the School of Veterinary Medicine — is open to the public. Faculty and resident clinicians along with supervised students treat more than 50,000 animals a year, ranging from cats and dogs to horses, livestock, and exotic species. The hospital provides 24/7 emergency services for those first four categories. The hospital also provides emergency services seven days a week during regular business hours for exotic animals.

The current hospital, along with five support buildings, opened in 1970. The VMTH provides training opportunities and clinical experiences for DVM students and postgraduate veterinarian residents. These residents are trained under the faculty's tutelage to be board-certified specialists in one of 34 specialty areas.

In August 2016, news coverage of several pet owners' complaints about expensive and ineffective care at the VMTH drew public attention to the fact that veterinarians working there were exempt from licensing by the California Department of Consumer Affairs. Thus, DCA's Veterinary Medical Board had no jurisdiction over VMTH vets, in contrast with vets in private practice who had been regulated by DCA and its predecessors for many years. UC Davis's chief veterinary medicine officer noted in a statement that at the time, the VMTH was treating about 41,000 small animals per year, but received on average less than 20 written complaints per year. In 2017, the academic exemption from veterinarian licensing was removed and a University Veterinary License was created for VMTH vets participating in patient care.

The hospital operates UC Veterinary Medical Center — San Diego at satellite facilities which opened in 2000 and 2008 to provide hemodialysis and cardiology services to Southern California pets (i.e., specialized services which the vast majority of veterinarians cannot provide). In March 2024, UC Davis bought a San Diego office building and began renovating the building into a veterinary hospital which opened in the fall of 2025. Like Davis, the new satellite hospital in San Diego offers 24/7 emergency services.

== Notable programs ==
The School of Veterinary Medicine was on the forefront of research into the 2007 pet food recalls. Other areas of research include chronic progressive lymphedema in horses and H1N1 influenza.

Under the terms of a memorandum of understanding with the California Department of Fish and Game, the school's Wildlife Health Center administers the Oiled Wildlife Care Network (OWCN) on behalf of the government of California. OWCN directly operates facilities for the cleaning and rehabilitation of oiled wildlife at Cordelia and San Pedro, and in emergencies can also draw upon the resources of 23 participating organizations.

The SeaDoc Society is an affiliated nonprofit with the veterinary school and the schools Karen C. Drayer Wildlife Health Center.

== Discoveries and distinctions ==
- Leads the nation's 30 accredited veterinary schools and colleges with more than $70 million in annual research funding.
- Faculty members that have been honored as members of the National Academy of Sciences or National Academy of Medicine include: Roy Doi, Bruce Hammock, Harris Lewin, Jonna Mazet, Stephen Barthold, Patricia Conrad, Tilahun Yilma, Michael Lairmore and Christine Kreuder Johnson.
- Five faculty members (Terrell Holliday [1998]; Gary P Carlson [2004]; Richard W Nelson [2012]; Bradford Smith [2019]; and Mark D Kittleson [2022]) have received the Robert W. Kirk Award for Professional Excellence from the American College of Veterinary Internal Medicine in recognition of outstanding achievements and dedicated service to the veterinary profession.
- The PREDICT initiative, led by the school's One Health Institute, was awarded $175 million by USAID to help detect and respond to emerging infectious diseases in more than 30 countries worldwide. Infectious disease scientists developed SpillOver open-source web application developed, launched in 2021 during the COVID-19 pandemic as a virus and host risk assessment tool
- Pioneered animal DNA Testing, including the discovery of a mutation in gene NKX2-8, that causes spinal dysraphism in dogs and could show clues about neural tube defects in humans, including spina bifida and anencephaly.
- Pioneered a new mandibular reconstruction procedure. Whiskey, a Munsterlander dog, received mandibular reconstruction after losing his jaw due to a cancerous growth. This new procedure uses a titanium plate in the form of a jawbone which contains a bone growth protein. Over time, the cells proliferate and give rise to an artificial jaw made of material that resembles natural bone.
- Identified mutations in the genes DLX5, DLX6 and ADAMTS20 that are associated with cleft palate and cleft lips in dogs and humans.
- Researchers first described simian immunodeficiency viruses (SIV) in monkeys and feline immunodeficiency viruses (FIV) in cats, which became the earliest animal models for AIDS research.
- In 1989, the International Laboratory of Molecular Biology for Tropical Disease and virologist Tilahun Yilma developed a genetically engineered vaccine for rinderpest and an inexpensive diagnostic kit designed to be stable under field conditions. In areas of Africa that depend on cattle for meat, milk products, and work, the rinderpest virus has caused famine and economic damage -$500 million in one outbreak of the 1980s.
- Much of the school's research focuses on identifying, treating, and preventing various diseases in animals. The J-5 vaccine against the E. coli infections that lead to bovine mastitis was formulated as a result of research conducted at UC Davis.
- Notable discoveries by faculty of the school include feline immunodeficiency virus (FIV), taurine deficiency as the cause of dilated cardiomyopathy (DCM) in domestic cats, and the first genetic cause of a heart disease in domestic cats (hypertrophic cardiomyopathy (HCM)).
