= Disease ecology =

Sub-discipline of ecology

Disease ecology is a sub-discipline of ecology concerned with the mechanisms, patterns, and effects of host-pathogen interactions, particularly those of infectious diseases. For example, it examines how parasites spread through and influence wildlife populations and communities. By studying the flow of diseases within the natural environment, scientists seek to better understand how changes within our environment can shape how pathogens, and other diseases, travel. Therefore, diseases ecology seeks to understand the links between ecological interactions and disease evolution. New emerging and re-emerging infectious diseases (infecting both wildlife and humans) are increasing at unprecedented rates which can have lasting impacts on public health, ecosystem health, and biodiversity.

== History ==
Over more than a century, disease ecology has evolved drastically. This field comes from the integration of epidemiology, zoology, and public health. The development of disease ecology over time has demonstrated the constantly changing scientific perspective about how pathogens, hosts, and environmental shape patterns of disease. The exact term of "disease ecology" was rather not as popular until the late 20th century, however, its key principles were determined early on through the idea that connected organisms to their environment.

=== Early foundations: 1800s-1940s ===
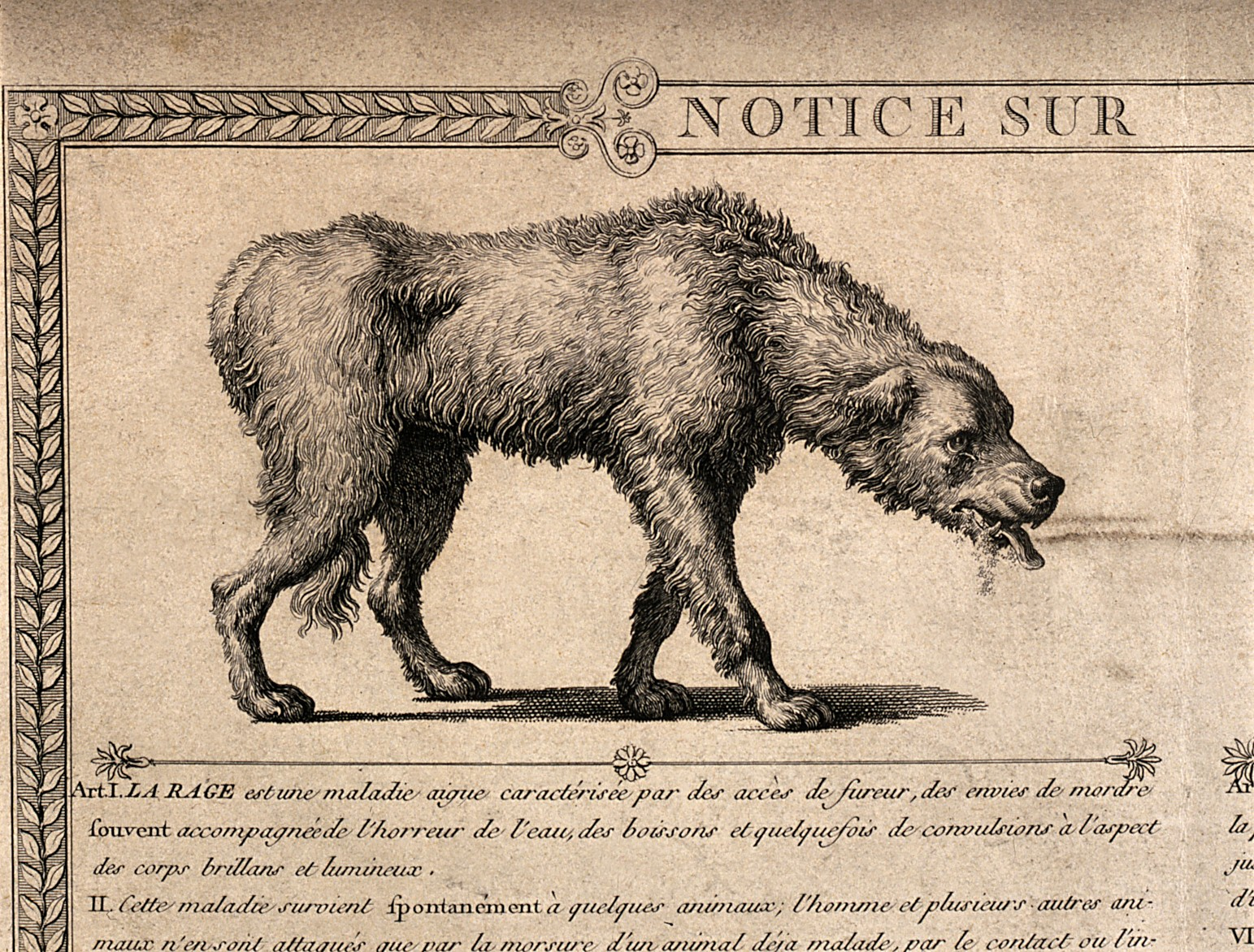
A Dog with Rabies and a Detail of its Skull - An Example of Rabies in Carnivores in the Early Times (1800s-1940s)

The earliest that the field of disease ecology dates back to is around the time of the germ theory (19th century). This theory established microorganisms as pathogens for infection; however, this was quickly realized that environmental conditions were the main factors that influenced disease patterns. For instance, studies done on malaria showed that the transmission of this disease relied on a parasite called Plasmodium and the ecology of mosquitoes called Anopheles as well as their habitats for breeding. Ronald Ross's mathematical models were one of the first of many attempts to quantify ecological interactions within disease systems. This work laid the foundation for future ecological frameworks. Researchers in the early 20th century studying wildlife diseases saw pathogens as a factor of a bigger ecological community. These diseases consisted of things such as rinderpest in Africa and rabies in carnivores. Disease studies, however, remained for the most part separate from the mainstream of ecology until the mid-20th century.

=== Development of disease ecology: 1950s-1980s ===
The shift towards more integrated ideas started in the mid-20th century, when ecologists such as Charls Elton recognized diseases as an ecological force that influences the dynamics of populations, especially after major events such as in the beginning of myxomatosis in European rabbit populations. During the same period, public health scientists that were studying vector-borne diseases began to incorporate ecological methods that examined how land use, climate, and interactions between species influenced transmission cycles. The field of disease ecology further matured through the mathematical modeling work of Anderson and May. Their research integrates host density, reproduction of parasites, immunity, and regulation of populations. These models allowed for a unifying theoretical foundation for disease ecology and continue to influence modern fields such as epidemiology, conservation biology, and public health.

=== Modern disease ecology and emerging diseases: 1990s-present ===
In the 1900s and 2000s, outbreaks such as HIV, SARS, Ebola, West Nile virus, and COVID-19 emphasized ecological drivers underlying infectious diseases. Researchers saw that spillover events were strongly influenced by the ecology of wildlife, biodiversity loss, human encroachment, and environmental change. The field of disease ecology became more interdisciplinary, integrating conservation science, global health, climate research, and veterinary medicine. During the same time period, new ecological frameworks suggested that reductions in biodiversity could possibly increase the risk of disease as they favor highly competent reservoir hosts. Improvements and advancements in molecular tools, satellite imaging, and climate modeling, helped to expand the field. This allowed researchers to map disease reservoirs, track the evolution of pathogens, and also predict the risk of outbreaks with precision. In today's modern world, disease ecology is important in order to understand things such as zoonotic spillover, wildlife conservation, and global health. The field's historic progression shows us that diseases are not just a medical phenomenon, rather an ecological process that is influenced by interactions among hosts, pathogens, and the constantly changing environment.

== Factors affecting spread of diseases ==
Parasitic infections, along with certain transmitted diseases, are present in wildlife which can have severe health effects on particular individuals and populations. Constant host-parasite interactions make disease ecology critical in conservation ecology.

=== Ecological factors ===
Ecological factors that can determine the persistence and the spread of diseases are population size, density, and composition. Host population size is important in the context of host-parasite interactions since the spread of diseases needs a host population large enough to sustain parasitic interactions. The health of the overall population (and the size of the weakened population members) will also influence the way that parasites and diseases will transmit among members. Additionally, competition and predation dynamics in the ecosystem can influence the density of potential hosts which can either propagate or limit the spread of diseases.

==== Predator-prey interactions ====
In some cases when a parasite has weakened an animal it will become easier prey for a predator species. Occasionally predators will prefer feeding on the sick or infected prey even though they carry a parasite because of the opportunity weak prey present. Without the presence of a predator species the prey species would likely exceed manageable numbers therefore leading to the rapid spread of pathogens throughout the prey population. Available host numbers increased when the infected individuals are not removed due to low predation. However, there are some situations where predator feeding can disturb a pathogen that previously was dormant leading to an epidemic that otherwise would not have occurred. Some parasites are able to survive when their host species is consumed leading to the parasite being distributed in the waste of the predator which can continue the spread of disease.

==== Parasitism ====
Parasitism in disease ecology is important because it can shape the way many habitats function because they are disease carriers. These diseases can alter the timing of events, biogeochemical cycles, and even the flow of energy in a habitat. Parasites are able to limit population growth and reproduction of species which may lead to a shift in the balance of an ecosystem. Other ways parasites impact systems are through nutrient cycles. Parasites are able to create imbalances of the elements in a system through the relationship they have with a host and the host's diet.

=== Biological factors ===
Biological factors that can determine the persistence of diseases include parameters pertaining at the level of the individual within the population (one single organism). Sex differences are found to be prevalent in disease transmission. For example, male American minks are larger and travel wider distances, making them more prone to come into contact with parasites and diseases. The host species age may additionally affect the rate in which diseases are transmitted. Younger members of populations have yet to acquire herd immunity and are therefore more susceptible to parasitic infections.

=== Anthropogenic factors ===
Anthropogenic factors of disease spread can be through the introduction or translocation of wildlife for conservation purposes by humans. Additionally, human activity is changing the way in which diseases move through the natural environment.

== In relation to anthropogenic factors ==
Humans are strongly impacting how diseases spread by creating what is known as "novel species associations". Globalization, mainly through world travel and trade, has created a system in which pathogens, and other species, are more in contact with one another than before. Ecological disruption, including habitat fragmentation and road construction, degrade natural landscapes and have been studied as drivers of recent emergence and re-emergence of infectious diseases worldwide. Scientists have speculated that habitat destruction and biodiversity loss are some of the main reasons influencing the rapid spread of non-human, disease carrying vectors. The loss of predators, that mitigate the ability for pathogen transmission, can increase the rate of disease transmission. Human anthropogenic induced climate change is becoming problematic, as parasites and their associated diseases, can move to higher latitudes with increasing global temperatures. New diseases can therefore infect populations that were previously never in contact with certain pathogens.

=== Urbanization and biodiversity loss ===
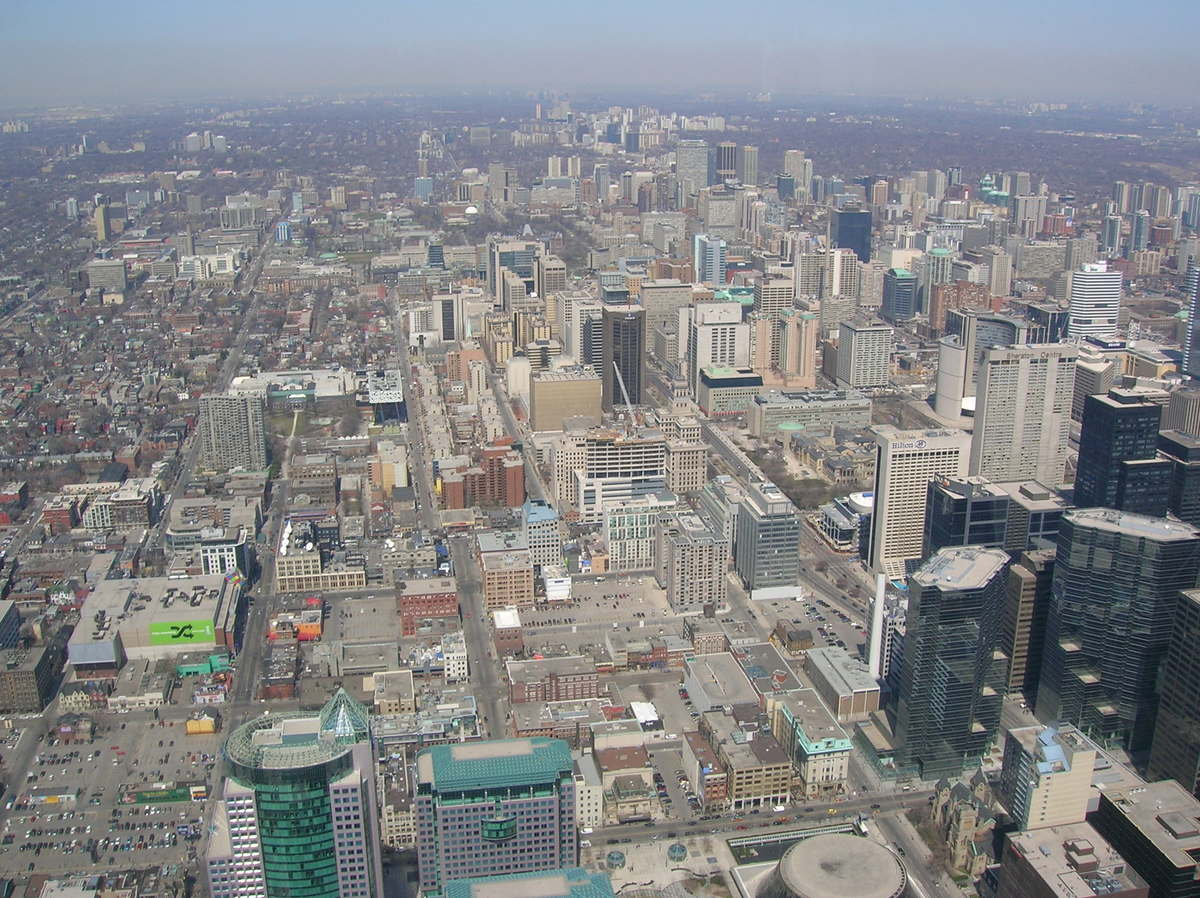
Urban sprawl of Toronto, Canada, viewed from the CN Tower

Urbanization is considered one of the main land-use changes, defined as the growth in the area and number of people inhabiting cities and creates artificial landscapes of built-up structures for human use. With over 65% of the global human population living in cities by 2025, ecological impacts of urbanization focuses mainly on biodiversity loss defined as the decline in species richness. With empirical evidence, scientists are understanding that biodiversity loss is associated with increased disease transmission and worsening of disease severity for humans, wildlife, and certain plant species. As biodiversity is lost worldwide, it is oftentimes the larger, slower reproducing animal species that will go extinct first. This leaves smaller, more adaptable, fast reproducing species abundant. Research has shown that these smaller species are more likely the ones to carry and transmit pathogens (key examples include bats, rats, and mice).

=== Invasive species ===
Globalization, especially world trade and travel, has facilitated the spread of non-native species worldwide. Newly introduced invasive species have the ability to alter ecological dynamics through local and regional extinction of native species. This can promote changes to the ecosystem including the shift in abundance and richness of native species. New invasive species, and the diseases they potentially carry, can escape into the environment and alter the existing natural ecosystems and the ecosystem services that people are dependent upon, including water quality and nutrient availability.

=== Habitat fragmentation ===
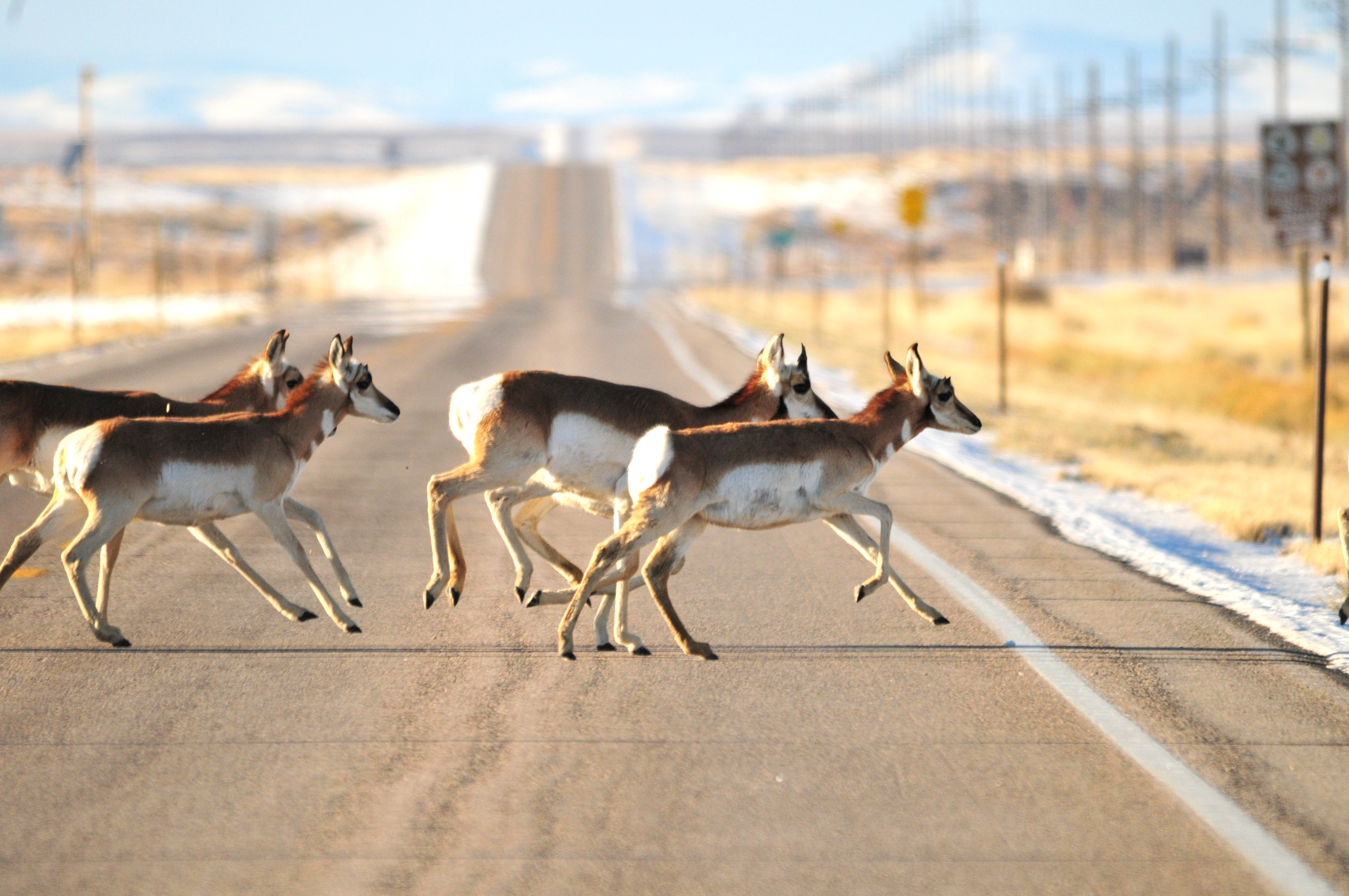
Highways can cause habitat fragmentation which increases edge effects and promotes disease spread.

Encroachment on natural ecosystems and wildlife with rapid urbanization exposes humans to a wide variety of disease carrying animals. Habitat fragmentation leads to increased edge effects and increases the contact between different communities, vectors, and pathogens which can increase disease transmission. It is argued that between 2013 and 2015, the Ebola virus disease (EDB) outbreak in West Africa began due to deforestation and habitat degradation. In this case, frugivorous and insectivorous bat species had less forest serving as a barrier between them and dense human settlements. Transmission of the Ebola virus is believed to have occurred through direct contact with bat species carrying the pathogen and humans, encroaching on natural ecosystems.

=== Climate change ===
Scientists have deemed vector borne diseases to be sensitive to changes in weather and climate. The abundance of disease carrying vectors in the environment depends on multiple factors, including temperature, relative humidity, and water availability, all factors necessary for the reproductive processes and success of disease carrying vectors. Climate change predictions include rising temperatures and changes in rainfall pattern which can create suitable habitats and increases the overall survival rate and fitness of pathogen carrying species. With a warming climate, pathogens and parasites can begin shifting their native geographic ranges to higher latitudes and infect host species in which they have no prior interaction with. The shift in rainfall patterns can additionally indicate the presence of disease carrying vectors. For example, mosquitos spread diseases such as malaria and lymphatic filariasis. The distribution of lymphatic filariasis via mosquitos can be determined by looking at soil moisture content, an indicator of viable mosquito breeding habitat (as mosquito larvae need shallow, stagnant water to survive). As temperature and precipitation patterns change, so will soil moisture levels and the corresponding mosquito populations.

As climate change continues to disrupt ecosystems around the world it can make both human and non-human populations more or less vulnerable to disease depending on the specific effects of climate change on the disease. The subject of climate change and its impact on disease is increasingly attracting the attention of health professionals and climate-change scientists, particularly with respect to malaria and other vector-transmitted human diseases. More specifically, climate change can impact malaria transmissions by extending the season of transmission and creating more breeding sites due to increasing temperatures and rainfall, respectively. Increases in malaria transmissions and other vector-transmitted human diseases can have a devastating impact on communities that do not receive appropriate medical care and on people who have not had exposure to these diseases.

==== In relation to tropical, northern temperate zones, and the Arctic ====
It is thought that the effects of climate change on temperature will increase with latitude. This means that northern temperate zones will experience more temperature changes than tropical zones. Tropical zones experience less climate variability, so organisms in tropical zones have adjusted to a continuous climate. Therefore, slight disruptions in climate can dramatically affect the organisms in tropical zones. Climate change can affect organisms by elongating their reproductive cycles. In addition to this, climate change allows for pathogens to expand beyond tropical zones, dramatically impacting species because of the introduction of new pathogens. These impacted species include humans and human livestock.

Changes in northern temperate zones and the Arctic are also expected. More specifically, the effects of climate change on temperature increase with latitude, so the temperature in northern temperate zones is projected to increase and the temperature in the Arctic is projected to increase even more. Like tropical zones, climate change in northern temperate zones and the Arctic can also cause species to move beyond their original niche. For example, climate change has allowed elk to move north in areas that overlap with other species such as caribou. When the elk move, they introduce new pathogens into the area, thus harming the caribou.

==== Models and predicting disease ecology ====
There are numerous approaches when predicting the impacts of climate change on diseases. Static approaches use reproduction rates to find how climate change will affect vectors. An example of the use of static approaches is a process-based model called MIASMA. This model explores the relationship between different climate change scenarios and the reproduction rate of vectors. This model has been used specifically to look at mosquitoes in African highlands to make predictions about the future of the development and feeding of mosquitoes. Additionally, this model can be used to find the population of mosquitoes that bite, allowing predictions of diseases such as dengue fever.

Another approach includes statistical based models, which relies on observations unlike process-based models. An example of this type of model is CLIMEX, which maps vector species over geographical locations while accounting for climate factors. This approach has limitations. CLIMEX does not include all factors that impact vector species.

Time-series models can also be used to find how climate change will modify disease dynamics. However this approach has a downside; only a limited number of locations and pathogens can be looked at simultaneously using time-series models.

Predictions of ENSO (El Niño Southern Oscillation) can also help predict diseases. ENSO events can create cooler temperatures in the Western Tropical Pacific and warmer temperatures in the Central and Eastern Tropical Pacific leading to intense precipitation and storms. Changes in climate due to ENSO can affect the dynamics of diseases and can affect the water sources humans use. For example, in 1991, cholera reappeared in Peru around the same time as an el Niño event occurred. ENSO events can be anticipated early on, and therefore by predicting ENSO, predictions about disease transmission peaks can be made up to two months before they occur.

== Notable examples in disease ecology ==
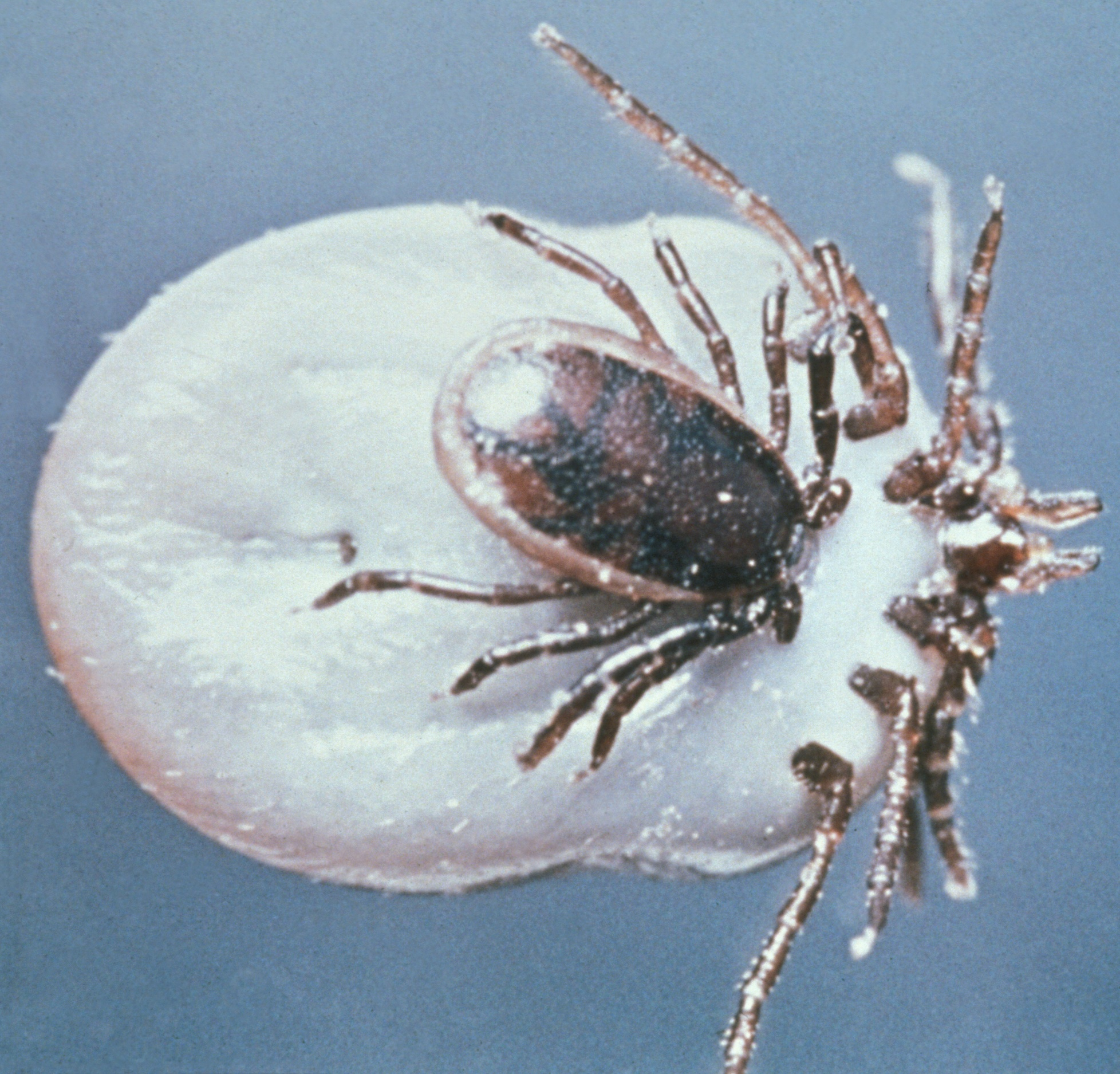
Ticks are a vector for Lyme disease.

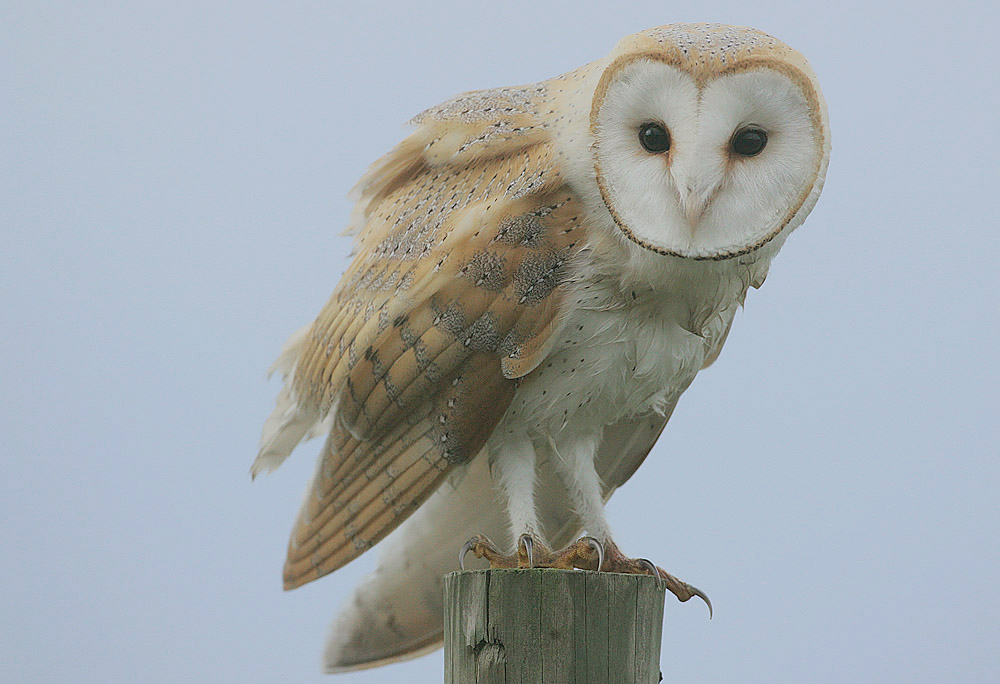
Barn owls are a host species for West Nile virus.

=== Malaria ===
Malaria is a disease transferred by the female Anopheles mosquito, located predominantly in sub-Saharan Africa and is a long withstanding public health issue. It is a disease that is strongly regulated by climate factors and therefore climate change will have a notable impact on the transmission of the disease. As temperatures warm, the reproductive phase of the Plasmodium parasite, within the gut of the female mosquito, will undergo completion. This will ensure that the female mosquito becomes infective before the end of its lifespan. Precipitation is also a critical factor for the breeding and the transmission of malaria and with climate change influencing regular precipitation patterns, studies are finding that mosquito breeding potential can increase as a direct result of climate change.

=== Lyme disease ===
Lyme disease is the most common tickborne disease throughout the United States and Europe with an estimated 476,000 cases in Europe and 200,000 cases in the United States per year. Recently, studies have concluded that there is an increased risk of Lyme disease in Southern Canada due to the home range expansion of the tick vector Ixodes scapularis, which is responsible for carrying the disease. Climate change creates milder winters and extended Spring and Autumn seasons. This creates hospitable habitats for ticks thrive at higher latitudes (where they are normally not found). Human infections of Lyme disease have been increasingly prominent in certain southern parts of Canadian provinces such as Ontario, Quebec, Manitoba, and Nova Scotia. According to Canadian published studies, other environmental factors are contributing to the expansion of the Ixodes scapularis home range which include the introduction of the vector through migratory birds and density of deer populations. Similarly, the introduction into Britain of the non-native Lyme disease vector Haemaphysalis punctata (and its subsequent spread), has been associated with migratory birds and sheep flock movements.

=== West Nile virus ===
West Nile virus is transferred between mosquitos and birds of prey including eagles, hawks, falcons, and owls. In the United States, West Nile Virus is being increasingly studied in New York and Connecticut due to the effects of climate change on two disease carrying vectors. Climate change is promoting the hybridization amongst two mosquito vectors (C. pipiens and C. quinquefasciatus) which can have an effect on the genetic composition of the hybrid allowing it to become more effective at transmitting diseases and increases its adaptability to different climactic conditions.

=== White-Nose Syndrome in Bats ===
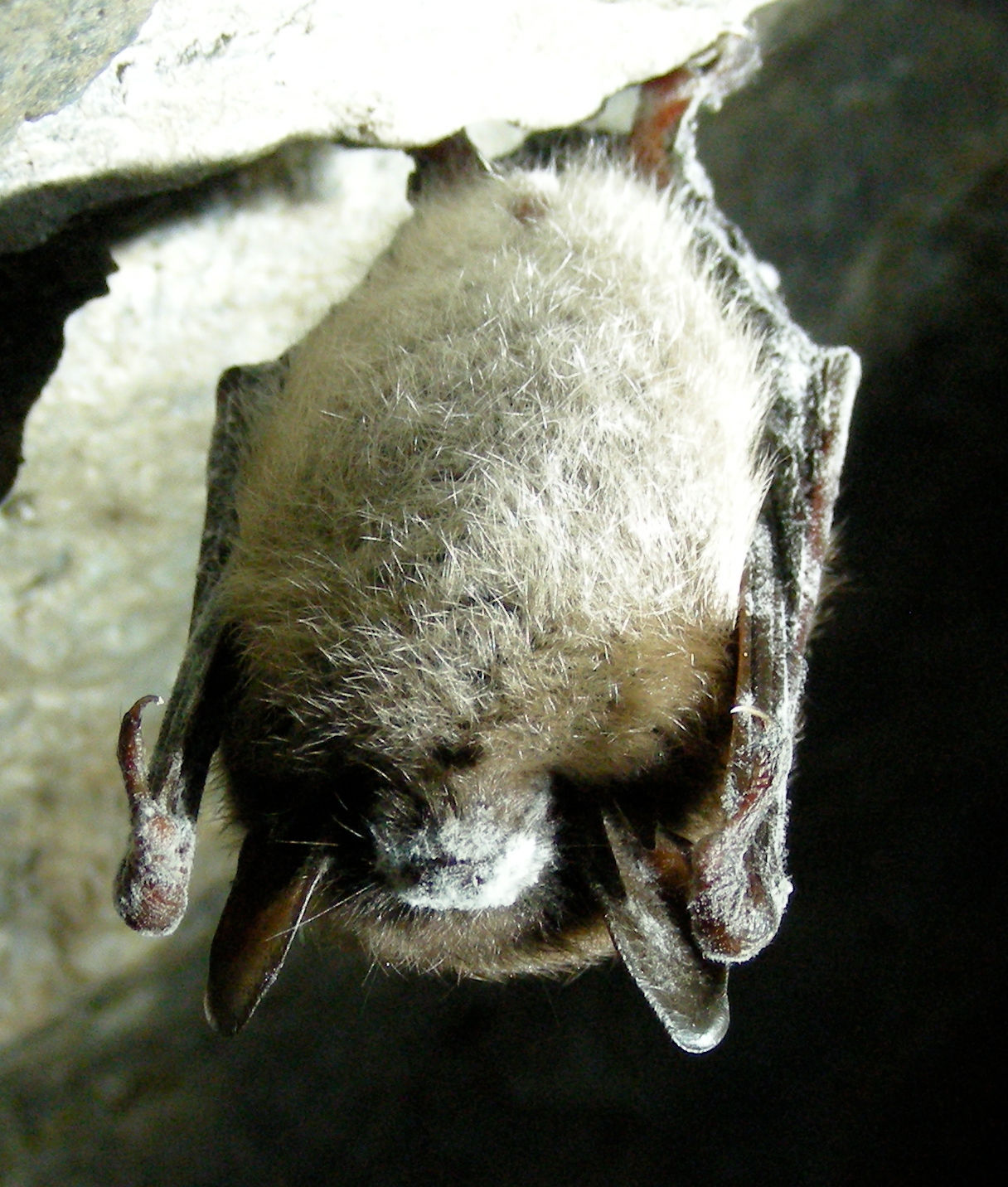
Small Brown Bat Diagnosed with White-Nose Syndrome

White-nose syndrome, or WNS, is a lethal disease that affects bats that hibernate in North America. This ecological disease is caused by Pseudogymnoascuc destructans, a psychrophilic fungus that thrives in the cold and humid conditions of a bat cave. This species of fungi invade the skin of the bats, more commonly around the nose/mouth areas and the wing areas. This invasive species creates a white, fungal-like and fuzzy appearance on the bats, hence the name of the syndrome. White-nose syndrome causes a disruption in the physiological processes during a bat's hibernation. These processes include things like water balance and energy regulation, leading bats to arouse from torpor more often than usual. Through the repetition of these arousals, fat reserves that are necessary for the survival through winter are quickly depleted. This loss of crucial fat causes starvation, dehydration, and a widespread of death in these bats. This syndrome in bats was first discovered in New York in 2006, where it caused multiple species of bat populations to decline past 90%, making history as one of the most dramatic wildlife population decreases ever recorded. This syndrome or disease is quickly spread to and from these organisms through their naturally social behaviors, such as the tendency of this species to huddle closely together during hibernation, and the nature of the fungal spores in the environmental characteristics of the bat caves.

=== Cholera ===
East Africa Cholera Outbreak

This example of how infectious disease dynamics is heavily influenced by marine ecology instead of only human sanitation conditions. The pathogen Vibrio cholerae is a natural inhabitant of brackish and also coastal waters. This is because its abundance changes with the changes of the ecology of the marine environment. A major ecological perception is that Vibrio cholerae attaches itself to zooplankton, specifically copepods, and act as both reservoirs and dispersal agents for the pathogen. Due to the expanding population of copepod during phytoplankton blooms, the growth of plankton communities directly increases environmental concentration of Vibrio cholerae, creating environmental conditions that are favorable to cholera outbreaks. The temperature of the ocean's surface as well as its salinity and nutrient levels play a major role in influencing plankton blooms. This makes cholera closely tied to oceanographic cycles. Warmer temperatures in the waters encourages the growth of phytoplankton, therefore boosting zooplankton and Vibrio cholerae populations, causing an ecological cascade that is repeatedly linked to a seasonal and climate-driven of cholera outbreaks. Remote sensing technologies have increasingly strengthened these connections through demonstrating that cholera outbreaks often align with chlorophyll concentrations, which are detected by satellites, and sea surface temperature anomalies. This predictability has changed the monitoring of public health and demonstrates that signals from the environment can prove to be early-warning signs for impending outbreaks. Because Vibrio cholerae attaches to the chitin surfaces of copepods, simple methods such as filtration can remove zooplankton from drinking water as well as reduce cholera risk by over 50%. This demonstrates how ecological knowledge can guide the public to lower-cost health solutions. As climate change accelerates ocean warming and intensifies the blooming of plankton, many researches have argued that cholera risk may rise globally as a result of these constantly changing ecological conditions.

== Health and medicine ==
Taking all of this information into consideration, health and medicine, in regard to disease ecology, are heavily influenced by the principles of this field in order to better comprehend how pathogens come about, how they spread, and how they live in human and/or animal populations. The health of organisms is in deep connection to the conditions of the environment, wildlife hosts, and changes in the environment, making it important to determining outbreaks as well as designing effective and efficient interventions to maintain steady health. For instance, zoonotic diseases, such as Ebola, hantavirus, and COVID-19, mostly come from wildlife and end up spilling over to humans when ecological disturbances cause a change in contact patterns between difference species. Environmental factors increase changes in contact patterns and include things such as deforestation, climate change, and also habitat fragmentation. These factors do so by closer relating wildlife, livestock, and humans together. Vector-borne diseases also highlight the ecological connection of warming temperatures expanding mosquito ranges and accelerate the development of pathogens, which raise risks for illnesses such as dengue, malaria, and Zika. Because of this, responses from public health should try to keep in mind as well as incorporate the ecological influences of diseases into developing medical treatments.

Through the concept of the One Health approach, which factor in human medicine, veterinary medicine, and environmental science to address the threats of health, disease ecology is able to provide new methods towards prevention of diseases. In controlling the transmission of rabies, for example, requires both controlling and treating human exposures as well as managing the vaccination of dog campaigns and wildlife interactions. In understanding how the loss of biodiversity can affect the transmission of pathogens, we can imply the preservation of ecosystem health as a factor to disease prevention. Through recognizing that human health is influenced by ecological systems, disease ecology provides a framework that strengthens our preparation for outbreak and overall improves public health decision-making.

== See also ==
- Epidemiology
- Immunology
- Microbiology
- Natural reservoir
- Threshold host density
- Zoonotic diseases
- Ecoimmunology

== Bibliography ==
- Ahmed, Sohel; Dávila, Julio D.; Allen, Adriana; Haklay, Mordechai (MUKI); Tacoli, Cecilia; Fèvre, Eric M. (2019). "Does urbanization make emergence of zoonosis more likely? Evidence, myths and gaps". Environment and Urbanization. 31 (2): 443–460. Bibcode:2019EnUrb..31..443A. doi:10.1177/0956247819866124. ISSN 0956-2478. PMC 6798138. PMID 31656370.
- Anderson, R. M. (1978). "The regulation of host population growth by parasitic species". Parasitology. 76 (2): 119–157. Bibcode:1978Paras..76..119A. doi:10.1017/S0031182000047739. ISSN 1469-8161. PMID 652386. S2CID 12758575.
- Bernot, Randall J. (2013). "Parasite–host elemental content and the effects of a parasite on host-consumer-driven nutrient recycling". Freshwater Science. 32 (1): 299–308. Bibcode:2013FWSci..32..299B. doi:10.1899/12-060.1. ISSN 2161-9549. S2CID 84997994.
- Bouchard, Catherine; Leonard, Erin; Koffi, Jules Konan; Pelcat, Yann; Peregrine, Andrew; Chilton, Neil; Rochon, Kateryn; Lysyk, Tim; Lindsay, L. Robbin; Ogden, Nicholas Hume (2015). "The increasing risk of Lyme disease in Canada". The Canadian Veterinary Journal. 56 (7): 693–699. ISSN 0008-5286. PMC 4466818. PMID 26130829.
- Bradley, Catherine A.; Altizer, Sonia (2007). "Urbanization and the ecology of wildlife diseases". Trends in Ecology & Evolution. 22 (2): 95–102. Bibcode:2007TEcoE..22...95B. doi:10.1016/j.tree.2006.11.001. ISSN 0169-5347. PMC 7114918. PMID 17113678.
- Cáceres, Carla E.; Knight, Christine J.; Hall, Spencer R. (2009). "Predator–spreaders: Predation can enhance parasite success in a planktonic host–parasite system". Ecology. 90 (10): 2850–2858. Bibcode:2009Ecol...90.2850C. doi:10.1890/08-2154.1. ISSN 1939-9170. PMID 19886493.
- Crowl, Todd A.; Crist, Thomas O.; Parmenter, Robert R.; Belovsky, Gary; Lugo, Ariel E. (2008). "The spread of invasive species and infectious disease as drivers of ecosystem change". Frontiers in Ecology and the Environment. 6 (5): 238–246. Bibcode:2008FrEE....6..238C. doi:10.1890/070151. ISSN 1540-9309.
- Dasgupta, Shouro (2018). "Burden of climate change on malaria mortality". International Journal of Hygiene and Environmental Health. 221 (5): 782–791. Bibcode:2018IJHEH.221..782D. doi:10.1016/j.ijheh.2018.04.003. hdl:10419/177238. ISSN 1438-4639. PMID 29706437. S2CID 13966938.
- Dillon, Michael E.; Wang, George; Huey, Raymond B. (2010). "Global metabolic impacts of recent climate warming". Nature. 467 (7316): 704–706. Bibcode:2010Natur.467..704D. doi:10.1038/nature09407. ISSN 0028-0836. PMID 20930843. S2CID 4428005.
- Dobson, Andy (2009). "Climate variability, global change, immunity, and the dynamics of infectious diseases". Ecology. 90 (4): 920–927. Bibcode:2009Ecol...90..920D. doi:10.1890/08-0736.1. ISSN 0012-9658. PMID 19449686.
- Duffy, Meghan A. (2009). "Staying alive: The post-consumption fate of parasite spores and its implications for disease dynamics". Limnology and Oceanography. 54 (3): 770–773. Bibcode:2009LimOc..54..770D. doi:10.4319/lo.2009.54.3.0770. ISSN 1939-5590. S2CID 86555551.
- Gray, J. S.; Dautel, H.; Estrada-Peña, A.; Kahl, O.; Lindgren, E. (2009). "Effects of Climate Change on Ticks and Tick-Borne Diseases in Europe". Interdisciplinary Perspectives on Infectious Diseases. 2009 e593232. doi:10.1155/2009/593232. ISSN 1687-708X. PMC 2648658. PMID 19277106.
- Hatcher, Melanie J.; Dick, Jaimie T. A.; Dunn, Alison M. (2006). "How parasites affect interactions between competitors and predators". Ecology Letters. 9 (11): 1253–1271. Bibcode:2006EcolL...9.1253H. doi:10.1111/j.1461-0248.2006.00964.x. ISSN 1461-0248. PMID 17040328.
- Hawley, Dana M.; Altizer, Sonia M. (2011). "Disease ecology meets ecological immunology: understanding the links between organismal immunity and infection dynamics in natural populations". Functional Ecology. 25 (1): 48–60. Bibcode:2011FuEco..25...48H. doi:10.1111/j.1365-2435.2010.01753.x. ISSN 1365-2435.
- Hoberg, Eric P.; Brooks, Daniel R. (2015). "Evolution in action: climate change, biodiversity dynamics and emerging infectious disease". Philosophical Transactions of the Royal Society B: Biological Sciences. 370 (1665) 20130553. doi:10.1098/rstb.2013.0553. PMC 4342959. PMID 25688014.
- Hudson, Peter J.; Dobson, Andrew P.; Newborn, David (1992). "Do Parasites make Prey Vulnerable to Predation? Red Grouse and Parasites". Journal of Animal Ecology. 61 (3): 681–692. Bibcode:1992JAnEc..61..681H. doi:10.2307/5623. ISSN 0021-8790. JSTOR 5623.
- Johnson, Pieter T. J.; Ostfeld, Richard S.; Keesing, Felicia (2015). "Frontiers in research on biodiversity and disease". Ecology Letters. 18 (10): 1119–1133. Bibcode:2015EcolL..18.1119J. doi:10.1111/ele.12479. PMC 4860816. PMID 26261049.
- Keesing, Felicia; Ostfeld, Richard S. (2021). "Impacts of biodiversity and biodiversity loss on zoonotic diseases". Proceedings of the National Academy of Sciences. 118 (17) e2023540118. Bibcode:2021PNAS..11823540K. doi:10.1073/pnas.2023540118. ISSN 0027-8424. PMC 8092607. PMID 33820825.
- Keller, Reuben P.; Geist, Juergen; Jeschke, Jonathan M.; Kühn, Ingolf (2011). "Invasive species in Europe: ecology, status, and policy". Environmental Sciences Europe. 23 (1): 23. doi:10.1186/2190-4715-23-23. ISSN 2190-4715. S2CID 4508469.
- Keyel, Alexander C.; Raghavendra, Ajay; Ciota, Alexander T.; Timm, Oliver Elison (2021). "West Nile virus is predicted to be more geographically widespread in New York State and Connecticut under future climate change". Global Change Biology. 27 (21): 5430–5445. Bibcode:2021GCBio..27.5430K. doi:10.1111/gcb.15842. ISSN 1365-2486. PMID 34392584. S2CID 237093429.
- Kołodziej-Sobocińska, Marta (2019). "Factors affecting the spread of parasites in populations of wild European terrestrial mammals". Mammal Research. 64 (3): 301–318. doi:10.1007/s13364-019-00423-8. ISSN 2199-241X. S2CID 71144806.
- Lafferty, Kevin D. (2009). "The ecology of climate change and infectious diseases". Ecology. 90 (4): 888–900. Bibcode:2009Ecol...90..888L. doi:10.1890/08-0079.1. ISSN 0012-9658. PMID 19449681.
- Lindsay, S. W.; Birley, M. H. (1996). "Climate change and malaria transmission". Annals of Tropical Medicine & Parasitology. 90 (5): 573–588. doi:10.1080/00034983.1996.11813087. ISSN 0003-4983. PMID 9039269.
- Marques, Adriana R.; Strle, Franc; Wormser, Gary P. (2021). "Comparison of Lyme Disease in the United States and Europe". Emerging Infectious Diseases. 27 (8): 2017–2024. doi:10.3201/eid2708.204763. ISSN 1080-6040. PMC 8314816. PMID 34286689.
- McCord, G.C. (2016). "Malaria ecology and climate change". The European Physical Journal Special Topics. 225 (3): 459–470. Bibcode:2016EPJST.225..459M. doi:10.1140/epjst/e2015-50097-1. ISSN 1951-6401. S2CID 55978131.
- Mordecai, Erin A.; Ryan, Sadie J.; Caldwell, Jamie M.; Shah, Melisa M.; LaBeaud, A. Desiree (2020). "Climate change could shift disease burden from malaria to arboviruses in Africa". The Lancet Planetary Health. 4 (9): e416–e423. Bibcode:2020LanPH...4.e416M. doi:10.1016/S2542-5196(20)30178-9. ISSN 2542-5196. PMC 7490804. PMID 32918887.
- Morand, Serge (2018), "Biodiversity and Disease Transmission", in Hurst, Christon J. (ed.), The Connections Between Ecology and Infectious Disease, Advances in Environmental Microbiology, vol. 5, Cham: Springer International Publishing, pp. 39–56, doi:10.1007/978-3-319-92373-4_2, ISBN 978-3-319-92373-4
- Ogden, Nicholas H. (2017). "Climate change and vector-borne diseases of public health significance". FEMS Microbiology Letters. 364 (19). doi:10.1093/femsle/fnx186. ISSN 1574-6968. PMID 28957457.
- Ostfeld, Richard S. (2015), "Disease Ecology", Ecology, Oxford University Press, doi:10.1093/obo/9780199830060-0128, ISBN 978-0-19-983006-0
- Packer, Craig; Holt, Robert D.; Hudson, Peter J.; Lafferty, Kevin D.; Dobson, Andrew P. (2003). "Keeping the herds healthy and alert: implications of predator control for infectious disease". Ecology Letters. 6 (9): 797–802. Bibcode:2003EcolL...6..797P. doi:10.1046/j.1461-0248.2003.00500.x. ISSN 1461-0248. S2CID 7845047.
- Pascual, Mercedes; Rodó, Xavier; Ellner, Stephen P.; Colwell, Rita; Bouma, Menno J. (2000). "Cholera Dynamics and El Niño-Southern Oscillation". Science. 289 (5485): 1766–1769. Bibcode:2000Sci...289.1766P. doi:10.1126/science.289.5485.1766. ISSN 0036-8075. PMID 10976073.
- Patz, J.A.; Githeko, A.K.; McCarty, J.P.; Hussain, S.; Confalonieri, U.; De Wet, N. (2003). "Climate change and infectious diseases". In McMichael, A. J.; Campbell-Lendrum, D. H.; Corvalan, C. F.; Ebi, K. L.; Githeko, A.; Scheraga, J. D.; Woodward, A. (eds.). Climate Change and Human Health: Risks and Responses. World Health Organization. pp. 103–132. ISBN 978-92-4-156248-5.
- Plowright, Raina K.; Sokolow, Susanne H.; Gorman, Michael E.; Daszak, Peter; Foley, Janet E. (2008). "Causal inference in disease ecology: investigating ecological drivers of disease emergence". Frontiers in Ecology and the Environment. 6 (8): 420–429. Bibcode:2008FrEE....6..420P. doi:10.1890/070086. ISSN 1540-9309.
- Pongsiri, Montira J.; Roman, Joe; Ezenwa, Vanessa O.; Goldberg, Tony L.; Koren, Hillel S.; Newbold, Stephen C.; Ostfeld, Richard S.; Pattanayak, Subhrendu K.; Salkeld, Daniel J. (2009). "Biodiversity Loss Affects Global Disease Ecology". BioScience. 59 (11): 945–954. Bibcode:2009BiSci..59..945P. doi:10.1525/bio.2009.59.11.6. ISSN 1525-3244. S2CID 47637829.
- Preston, Daniel L.; Mischler, John A.; Townsend, Alan R.; Johnson, Pieter T. J. (2016). "Disease Ecology Meets Ecosystem Science". Ecosystems. 19 (4): 737–748. Bibcode:2016Ecosy..19..737P. doi:10.1007/s10021-016-9965-2. ISSN 1435-0629. S2CID 14162302.
- Rogalski, Mary A.; Gowler, Camden D.; Shaw, Clara L.; Hufbauer, Ruth A.; Duffy, Meghan A. (2017). "Human drivers of ecological and evolutionary dynamics in emerging and disappearing infectious disease systems". Philosophical Transactions of the Royal Society B: Biological Sciences. 372 (1712) 20160043. doi:10.1098/rstb.2016.0043. PMC 5182439. PMID 27920388.
- Rulli, Maria Cristina; Santini, Monia; Hayman, David T. S.; D'Odorico, Paolo (2017). "The nexus between forest fragmentation in Africa and Ebola virus disease outbreaks". Scientific Reports. 7 (1) 41613. Bibcode:2017NatSR...741613R. doi:10.1038/srep41613. ISSN 2045-2322. PMC 5307336. PMID 28195145. S2CID 13594147.
- Short, Erica E; Caminade, Cyril; Thomas, Bolaji N (2017). "Climate Change Contribution to the Emergence or Re-Emergence of Parasitic Diseases". Infectious Diseases: Research and Treatment. 10 1178633617732296. doi:10.1177/1178633617732296. ISSN 1178-6337. PMC 5755797. PMID 29317829.
- Sridhar, D.; Gostin, L. (2014). "World Health Organization: past, present and future". Public Health. 128 (2): 117–118. doi:10.1016/j.puhe.2013.12.007. PMID 24388182.
- Vidaña, Beatriz; Busquets, Núria; Napp, Sebastian; Pérez-Ramírez, Elisa; Jiménez-Clavero, Miguel Ángel; Johnson, Nicholas (2020). "The Role of Birds of Prey in West Nile Virus Epidemiology". Vaccines. 8 (3): 550. doi:10.3390/vaccines8030550. PMC 7564710. PMID 32967268.
