= Menangle pararubulavirus =

Virus classification
- (unranked): Virus
- Realm: Riboviria
- Kingdom: Orthornavirae
- Phylum: Negarnaviricota
- Class: Monjiviricetes
- Order: Mononegavirales
- Family: Paramyxoviridae
- Genus: Pararubulavirus
- Species: Menangle pararubulavirus

Synonyms
- Menangle virus

Species of virus

Menangle pararubulavirus, also called Menangle virus, is a virus that infects pigs, humans and bats.

== History ==
Menangle virus was first identified in 1997 after a piggery in Menangle near Sydney, NSW, Australia experienced a high number of stillbirths and deformities during farrowing. Two workers at the piggery came down with an unexplained serious flu-like illness, but subsequently recovered. They later tested positive for Menangle virus antibodies. This outbreak was quickly controlled through disinfection and temporary depopulation of individual units in the pig farm.

== Vector ==
The source of the outbreak may have been a nearby population of fruit bats or flying foxes. Bats appear to be an asymptomatic host. Infection is thought to occur through serious contact with bodily fluids from infected animals (i.e. blood and possibly foetal matter).

Menangle is related to the recently discovered Tioman virus which is also bat-borne.

Menangle is one of three recently discovered zoonotic viruses in Australia that are carried by bats. The others are Hendra virus and Australian bat lyssavirus (ABLV or bat rabies).

== Virus appearance ==
Like all paramyxoviruses, Menangle virus has an envelope, negative sense ssRNA, and pleomorphic (both spherical and elongated forms) proteins (HN and fusion) which protrude from the surface as spikes that help the virus get into cells. As an RNA virus, it must enter the cell to replicate.

== Clinical signs and symptoms ==
Swine: Reduced conception rates; reduced litter size; large number of stillborn fetuses (some with severe skeletal/craniofacial defects); virus found in the lungs, brain and heart of stillborn piglets; No signs of illnesses in pigs of any age after birth.

Humans: Illness lasts for 10–14 days; fever; chills; rigors; drenching sweats; malaise; headache; red spotty rash.

Bats: Asymptomatic

== Post-mortem lesions ==
Hydranencephaly: meaning the cerebral cortex has a large cavity where the cerebral hemispheres are missing and is instead filled with cerebrospinal fluid.

Limbs are often rigid and hyperflexed.

Uneven alignment of upper and lower teeth.
