= Cordillera =

Extensive chain of mountains or mountain ranges

A cordillera is a chain or network of mountain ranges, such as those in the west coast of the Americas. The term is borrowed from Spanish, where the word comes from cordilla, a diminutive of cuerda ('rope').

The term is most commonly used in physical geography and is particularly applied to the various large mountain systems of the American Cordillera, such as the Andes of South America, and less frequently to other mountain ranges in the "ridge" that rims the Pacific Ocean. In Colombia and Venezuela, cordilleras are named according to their position: Cordillera Occidental, Central, and Oriental. Various local names are used for the cordilleras in Ecuador, Peru, Bolivia, Chile and Argentina.

Such mountain systems have a complex structure, which is usually the result of folding and faulting accompanied by volcanic activity. In South America, the ranges include numerous volcanic peaks. The Andes cordillera has Ojos del Salado, the highest active volcano in the world and second-highest point in the Western Hemisphere (though not itself a volcano, Argentina's Aconcagua, at 6,960 m (22,830 ft), is the highest point in the Western Hemisphere). Some of the volcanoes have been active in historical times.

Aside from the volcanic peaks, the cordilleran crests include many narrow ridges, some of which reach into the zone of permanent snow. Between the ranges are numerous inhabited valleys, basins and low plateaus, with a wide range of elevations.

== Notable cordilleras ==
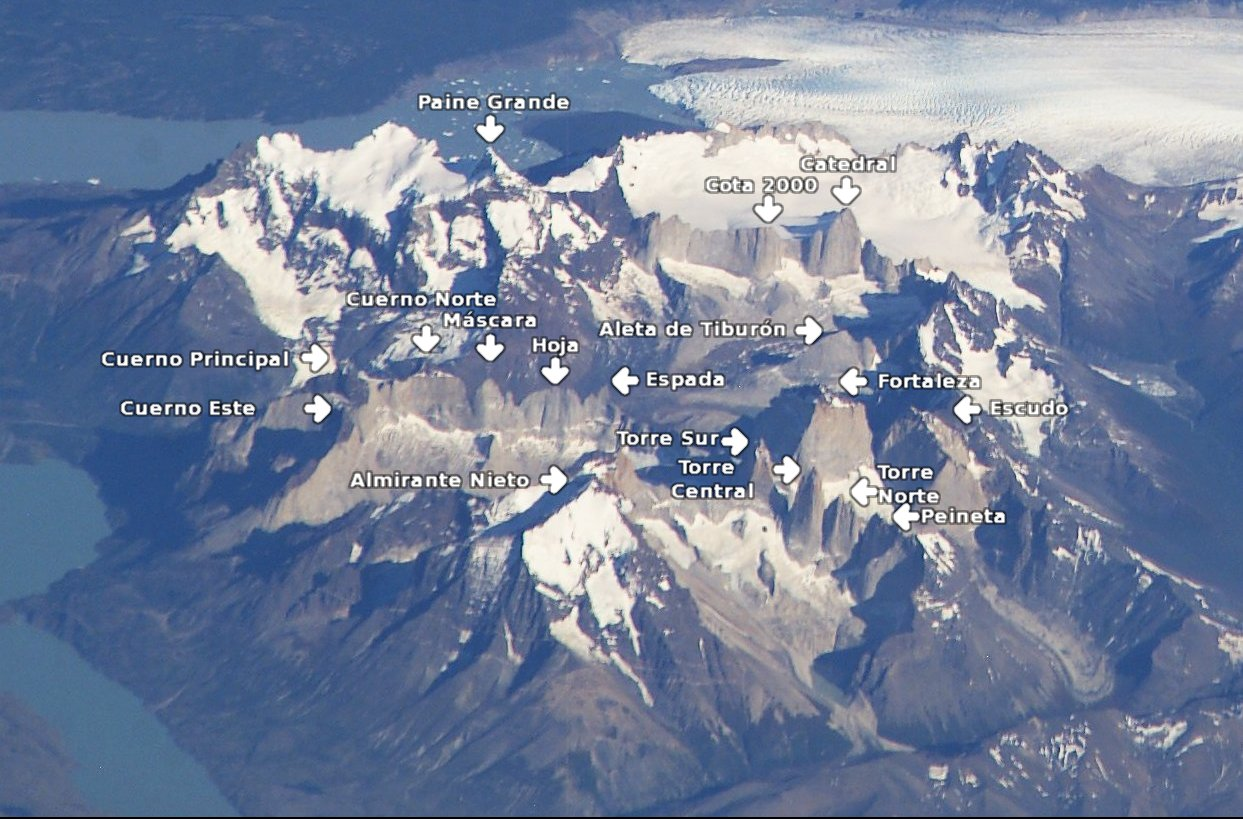
A labeled image of the mountains of the Cordillera del Paine, in Chile

- Alborz Cordillera, northern Iran (also written as Elburz)
- American Cordillera, the mountain ranges forming the western backbone of North America and South America
  - North American Cordillera (also called Pacific Cordillera or Western Cordillera of North America), comprising the mountain ranges of western North America
    - Cordillera Central, Costa Rica
    - Cordillera Central, Dominican Republic on the island of Hispaniola
    - Cordillera Central, Puerto Rico
    - Cordillera Neovolcánica, an active volcanic belt in Mexico
    - Mexican Cordillera, consisting of the Juarez Segment, the Huayacocotla Segment, the Victoria Segment, and the Nuevoleones Cordillera
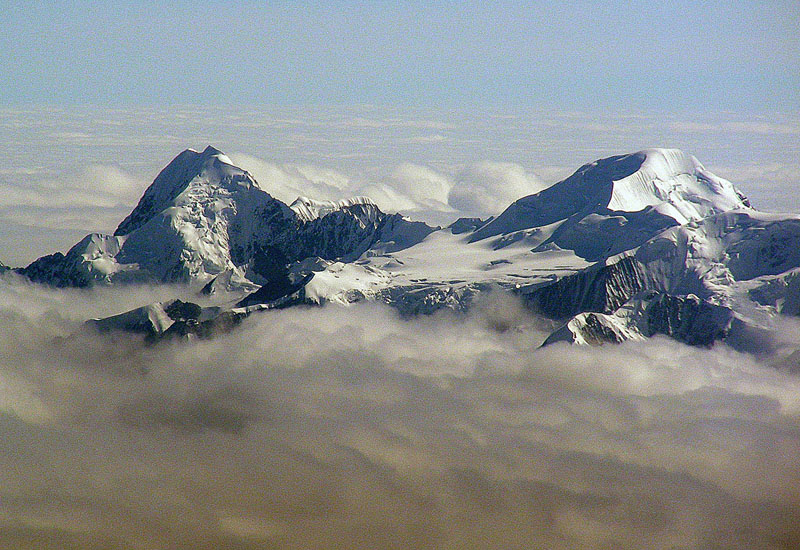
      Ancohuma and Illampu, part of the Cordillera Real subrange of the larger Andes in Bolivia
  - Cordillera de los Andes (also called the Andes Mountains or South American Cordillera), comprising the mountain ranges of western South America
    - Cordillera Blanca, in Peru
    - Cordillera de Mérida, in Venezuela
    - Cordillera Central, Andes (Spanish: "central mountains"), several mountain ranges share the name, such as the one in Bolivia, Colombia, Ecuador and Peru
    - Cordillera Occidental ("western mountains"), several mountain ranges share the name, such as the one in Bolivia, Colombia, Ecuador and Peru
    - Cordillera Oriental ("eastern mountains"), several mountain ranges share the name, such as the one in Bolivia, Colombia, Ecuador and Peru
    - Cordillera de la Costa ("coastal mountains") of Chile
    - Cordillera Paine, in Torres del Paine National Park in Chilean Patagonia
  - Cordillera de la Costa of Venezuela
- Annamese Cordillera (Annamite Range), in Laos and Vietnam
- Arctic Cordillera, the mountain ranges along the northeastern edge of the Arctic Archipelago and the northeasternmost part of the Labrador Peninsula in Labrador and Quebec, Canada
- Central Cordillera of New Guinea
- Cordillera Central of Luzon and Southern Pacific Cordillera of Mindanao in the Philippines
- Cordilleras Béticas, Central and Cantábrica (including the Picos de Europa) in Spain
- East Australian Cordillera, more commonly known as the Great Dividing Range, the most significant topographic feature of the east coast of Australia
- High-Mountain Asia, mountain ranges surrounding the Tibetan Plateau, including the Himalayas, Hindu Kush, Kunlun Mountains, Tian Shan, Karakoram, Pamir-Alay and Hengduan Mountains
