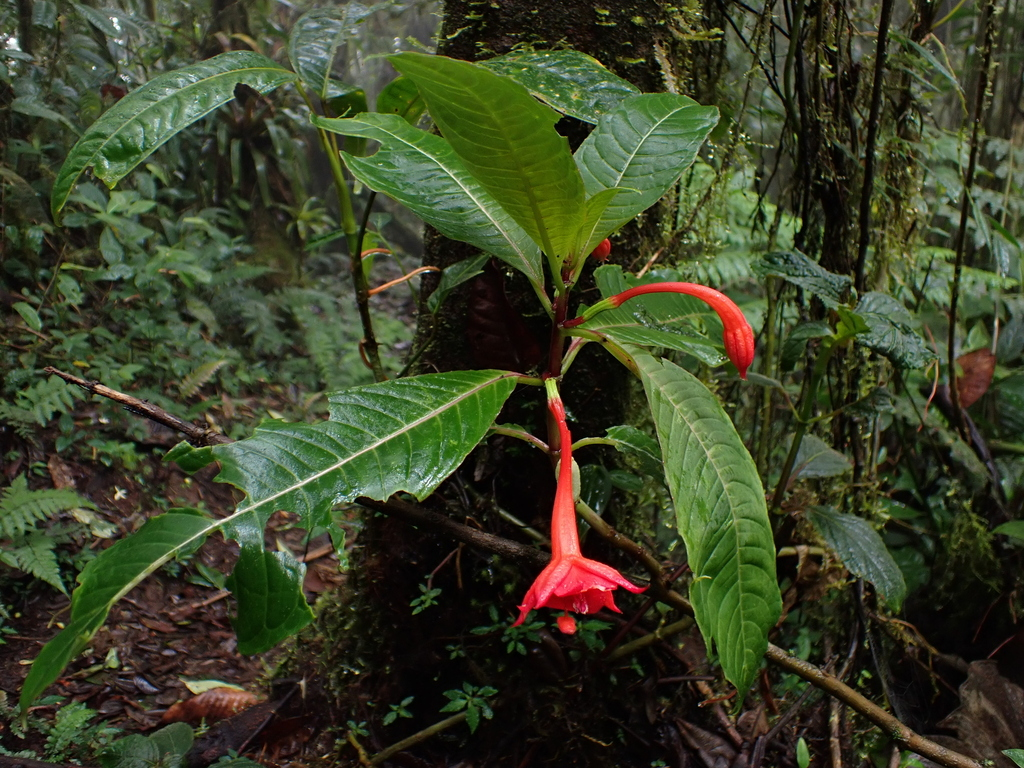

Scientific classification
- Kingdom: Plantae
- Clade: Embryophytes
- Clade: Tracheophytes
- Clade: Angiosperms
- Clade: Eudicots
- Clade: Rosids
- Order: Myrtales
- Family: Onagraceae
- Genus: Fuchsia
- Species: F. macrostigma

Binomial name
- Fuchsia macrostigma Benth.

Synonyms
- Fuchsia macrostigma var. typica Munz; Fuchsia longiflora Benth.; Fuchsia macrostigma var. longiflora (Benth.) Munz; Fuchsia spectabilis Hook.; Fuchsia spectabilis var. pubens I.M.Johnst.

= Fuchsia macrostigma =

Species of flowering plant

Fuchsia macrostigma is a species of flowering plant in the family Onagraceae. It is a shrub with red, funnel-shaped flowers. The fruits are ellipsoid berries. The species is native to Colombia and Ecuador, and was described in 1844.

The flowers of Fuchsia macrostigma are visited by hummingbirds.

== Taxonomy ==
The species was described by George Bentham in 1844.

It is part of a species group with Fuchsia denticulata, Fuchsia austromontana, Fuchsia harlingii, Fuchsia cochabambana, and Fuchsia magdalenae.

== Distribution ==
Fuchsia macrostigma is native to the wet tropical biome of Colombia and Ecuador (El Oro Province). It grows in moist cloud forests on the Cordillera Occidental, at elevations of 1,000–2,500 metres (3,300–8,200 ft). The species occurs on both sides of the Patía River.

== Description ==
Fuchsia macrostigma is a shrub that grows 0.5–1.5 metres (1.6–4.9 ft) high. The branchlets are stout, 2–7 millimetres (0.079–0.276 in) thick, cylindrical or angled, and green to purple. The older branches are 8–15 millimetres (0.31–0.59 in) thick, and dull tan in colour.

The leaves are elliptical to obovate, and arranged oppositely, or are in groups of three. The leaves are 6–27 centimetres (2.4–10.6 in) long, and 3–12 centimetres (1.2–4.7 in) wide. The leaf edges have small teeth. The leaf stems are 15–30 millimetres (0.59–1.18 in) long.

The flower stems are 8–20 millimetres (0.31–0.79 in) long. The floral tube is pale to dark red, 5–8 centimetres (2.0–3.1 in) long, and narrowly funnel-shaped. The tube is 2–5 millimetres (0.079–0.197 in) wide at the base, and 4–10 millimetres (0.16–0.39 in) wide at the rim. The sepals are red with green tips, lanceolate-oblong, 14–23 millimetres (0.55–0.91 in) long, and 7–8 millimetres (0.28–0.31 in) wide. The petals are bright red, orbicular to obovate, 12–18 millimetres (0.47–0.71 in) long, and 10–19 millimetres (0.39–0.75 in) wide.

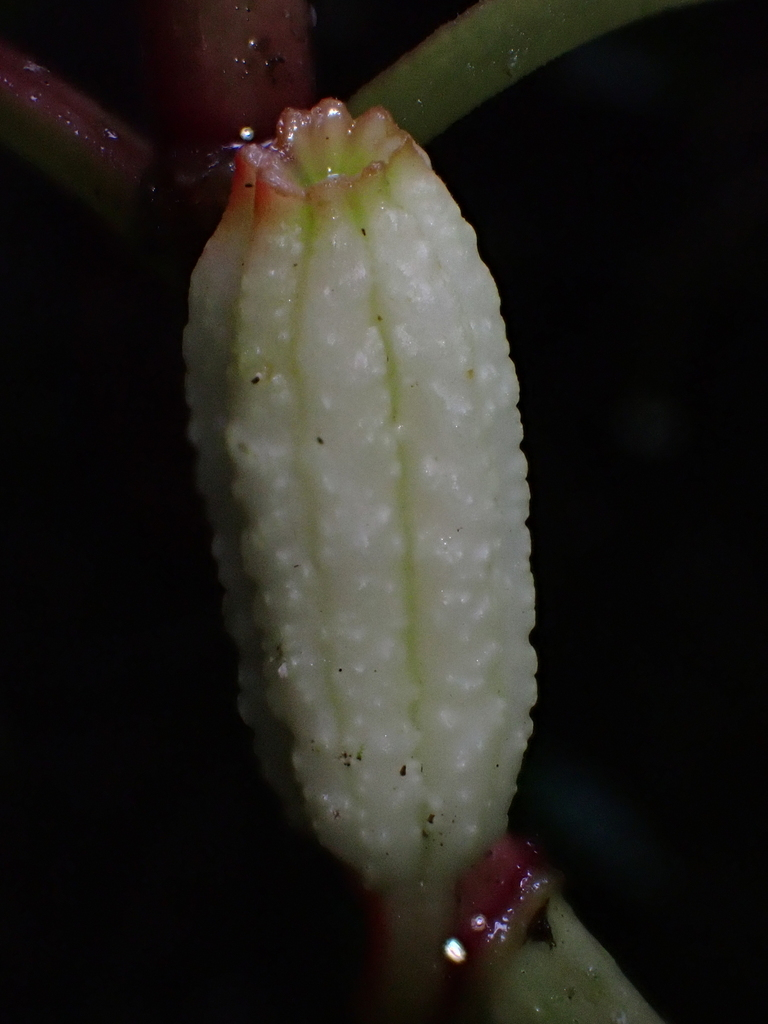
Berry

The fruit is an ellipsoid berry, which has eight grooves until it is ripe. The berry is 20–22 millimetres (0.79–0.87 in) long, 8–12 millimetres (0.31–0.47 in) thick, and covered with warts. The seeds are tan brown, 2–2.5 millimetres (0.079–0.098 in) long, and 1.2–2.6 millimetres (0.047–0.102 in) wide.

== Ecology ==
The flowers of Fuchsia macrostigma are visited by hummingbirds, including the White-throated daggerbill, Fawn-breasted brilliant, Brown inca, Collared inca, and the Tawny-bellied hermit.

Fuchsia macrostigma is sympatric with Fuchsia putumayensis, Fuchsia sessifolia, Fuchsia scabriuscula and Fuchsia sylvatica.

== Hybrids ==
Fuchsia macrostigma has been artificially hybridised with Fuchsia denticulata.
