= Fuchsia ceracea =

Scientific classification
- Kingdom: Plantae
- Clade: Tracheophytes
- Clade: Angiosperms
- Clade: Eudicots
- Clade: Rosids
- Order: Myrtales
- Family: Onagraceae
- Genus: Fuchsia
- Species: F. ceracea

Binomial name
- Fuchsia ceracea P.E.Berry

Species of flowering plant

Fuchsia ceracea is a species of flowering plant in the family Onagraceae. It is a shrub or liana with waxy leaves, and pink, red, and purple flowers. The species is native to Peru, and was described in 1982.

== Taxonomy ==
The species was described by Paul Edward Berry in 1982. It is part of the section Fuchsia, and forms a species group with Fuchsia simplicicaulis, Fuchsia coriacifolia, and Fuchsia sanmartina.

== Distribution ==
Fuchsia ceracea is native to the wet tropical biome of Huánuco, Peru. It grows at elevations of 2,500–2,850 metres (8,200–9,350 ft).

Fuchsia ceracea occurs sympatrically with Fuchsia abrupta and Fuchsia corymbiflora.

== Description ==
Fuchsia ceracea is a climbing shrub or liana with long, drooping branches, that grows up to 6 metres (20 ft) off the ground. The plant lacks hairs, except for on the young flowers and stems.

The leaves are arranged oppositely, or into groups of three. The leaves are waxy, lanceolate to narrowly ovate, firmly membranous, 8–15 centimetres (3.1–5.9 in) long, 4–6 centimetres (1.6–2.4 in) wide, and have smooth edges. The leaf stems are 2–20 millimetres (0.079–0.787 in) long, reddish, and slightly twisted.

The inflorescence is a simple hanging raceme, with whorls of two to three flowers. The flower stems are 7–15 millimetres (0.28–0.59 in) long. The floral tube is subcylindrical to narrowly funnel-shaped, 6–7 millimetres (0.24–0.28 in) wide at the base, and 8–9 millimetres (0.31–0.35 in) wide at the rim. The floral tube is one of the longest in the section Fuchsia, at 10–13 centimetres (3.9–5.1 in). The tube is lavender to bright pink on the outside, and white inside. The sepals are lanceolate, 2.8–3 centimetres (1.1–1.2 in) long, 6–7 millimetres (0.24–0.28 in) wide, and lavender to bright pink. The petals are crimson to dark purple, 5–7 millimetres (0.20–0.28 in) long, and around 4 millimetres (0.16 in) wide.

The plant has eleven pairs of chromosomes.
