= Fuchsia cochabambana =

Scientific classification
- Kingdom: Plantae
- Clade: Tracheophytes
- Clade: Angiosperms
- Clade: Eudicots
- Clade: Rosids
- Order: Myrtales
- Family: Onagraceae
- Genus: Fuchsia
- Species: F. cochabambana

Binomial name
- Fuchsia cochabambana P.E.Berry

Species of flowering plant

Fuchsia cochabambana is a species of flowering plant in the family Onagraceae. It is a shrub with membranous leaves, and hanging orange-red flowers. The species is native to Bolivia, and was described in 1982.

== Taxonomy ==
The species was described by Paul Edward Berry in 1982. It is in the section Fuchsia, and forms part of a species group with Fuchsia denticulata, Fuchsia austromontana, Fuchsia harlingii, Fuchsia macrostigma, and Fuchsia magdalenae.

== Distribution ==
Fuchsia cochabambana is native to the wet tropical biome of Bolivia (Cochabamba Department and Santa Cruz Department). It grows in cloud forests.

Fuchsia cochabambana occurs sympatrically with Fuchsia sanctae-rosae.

== Description ==
Fuchsia cochabambana is a shrub that grows 0.5–1.5 metres (1.6–4.9 ft) high.

The leaves are firmly membranous, elliptical or elliptic-lanceolate, 3–12 centimetres (1.2–4.7 in) long, and 1–5 centimetres (0.39–1.97 in) wide. The leaves are arranged into groups of three or four, and have 1–3 millimetres (0.039–0.118 in) stems.

The flowers are hanging, and tightly grouped at the ends of branches. The flower stems are 7–30 millimetres (0.28–1.18 in) long. The floral tube is narrowly funnel-shaped, 45–58 millimetres (1.8–2.3 in) long, around 3 millimetres (0.12 in) wide at the base, and 7–10 millimetres (0.28–0.39 in) at the rim. The sepals are lanceolate, 16–18 millimetres (0.63–0.71 in) long, and around 5 millimetres (0.20 in) wide. The floral tube and sepals are orange to crimson in colour. The petals are red, elliptical, 10–13 millimetres (0.39–0.51 in) long, and 5–8 millimetres (0.20–0.31 in) wide.
