= Eastern Range (disambiguation) =

The Eastern Range is a U.S. rocket range on the east coast of Florida.

Eastern Range or variation, may also refer to:

- Eastern Ranges, an Australian-rules football team in the state of Victoria, Australia.
- Eastern Range mine, Pilbara region, Western Australia, Australia; an iron ore mine named "Eastern Range"
- Eastern Range (Kamchatka), Russia; a mountain range
- Great Eastern Ranges, a cordillera in eastern Australia, extending from Victoria to Queensland

== See also ==
- Cordillera Oriental (disambiguation) aka "Eastern Range"
- Western Range (disambiguation)
- Eastern (disambiguation)
- Range (disambiguation)
