= Western Range =

The Western Range may refer to:

- Various mountain ranges:
  - California Coast Ranges in the United States
  - Pacific Cordillera or Rocky Mountains of North America
  - Western Range (Canada), another name for the Kootenay Ranges of the Canadian Rockies
  - Western Range (Taiwan), a former name of the Xueshan Range
  - Western Range (Tasmania), another name for the West Coast Range
- Western Range (USSF), a missile and launch range

== See also ==
- West Range in Nevada, USA
- West Mountains in Idaho, USA
- Western Mountains or Western Hills in Beijing, China
- Jabal al Gharbi District, a region of Libya whose name means the "Western Mountains"
- Cordillera Occidental (disambiguation) aka "Western Range"
- Eastern Range (disambiguation)
- Western (disambiguation)
- Range (disambiguation)
