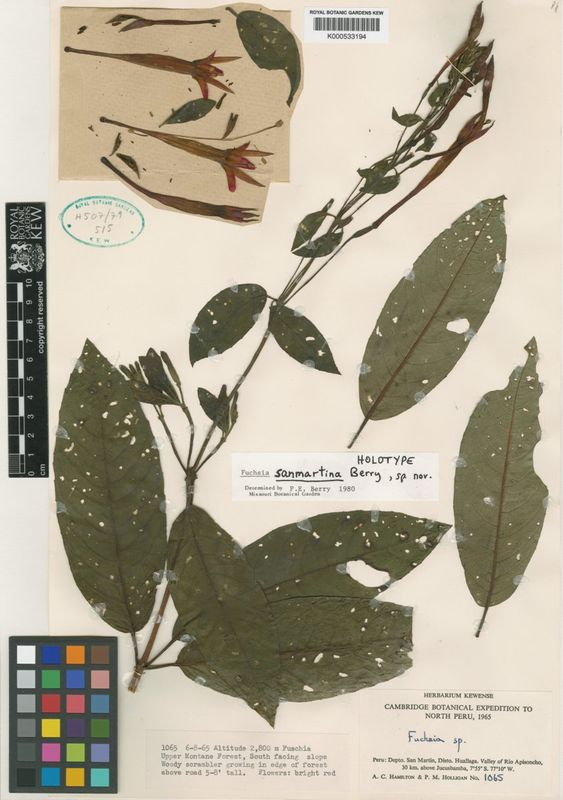

Scientific classification
- Kingdom: Plantae
- Clade: Embryophytes
- Clade: Tracheophytes
- Clade: Angiosperms
- Clade: Eudicots
- Clade: Rosids
- Order: Myrtales
- Family: Onagraceae
- Genus: Fuchsia
- Species: F. sanmartina

Binomial name
- Fuchsia sanmartina P.E.Berry

= Fuchsia sanmartina =

Species of flowering plant

Fuchsia sanmartina is a species of flowering plant in the family Onagraceae. It is a shrub or climbing plant with firmly membranous leaves and hanging red flowers. The species is native to northern Peru, and was described in 1982.

== Taxonomy ==
Fuchsia sanmartina was described by Paul Edward Berry in 1982.

It is part of a species group that includes Fuchsia simplicicaulis, Fuchsia ceracea, and Fuchsia coriacifolia.

== Distribution ==
Fuchsia sanmartina is native to the wet tropical biome of northern Peru. The type locality is in the Department of San Martín, Peru. The species has been collected from an elevation of 2,800–3,600 metres (9,200–11,800 ft).

It occurs sympatrically with Fuchsia decussata and Fuchsia ferreyrae.

== Description ==
Fuchsia sanmartina is a shrub that grows 1.5–3 metres (4.9–9.8 ft) high, or a climber that grows 10 metres (33 ft) high. The young branches are covered in short hairs.

The leaves are usually in groups of three, or are sometimes arranged oppositely. The leaves are firmly membranous, narrowly elliptic-ovate, 5–15 centimetres (2.0–5.9 in) long, and 1.5–6 centimetres (0.59–2.36 in) wide. The leaf stems are 3–20 millimetres (0.12–0.79 in) long.

The inflorescence is a raceme with multiple hanging flowers. The flower stems are 13–50 millimetres (0.51–1.97 in) long. The flowers are bright red. The floral tube is subcylindrical, 55–76 millimetres (2.2–3.0 in) long, 3–4 millimetres (0.12–0.16 in) wide at the base, and 6–7 millimetres (0.24–0.28 in) wide at the rim. The sepals are tapering, 20–25 millimetres (0.79–0.98 in) long, and 4–5 millimetres (0.16–0.20 in) wide. The petals are narrowly lanceolate-elliptical, 10–16 millimetres (0.39–0.63 in) long, and 3–6 millimetres (0.12–0.24 in) wide.
