= Cordillera Oriental =

Cordillera Oriental from the Spanish language meaning "Eastern range" may refer to:

- Cordillera Oriental (Bolivia)
- Cordillera Oriental (Colombia)
- Cordillera Oriental (Ecuador)
- Cordillera Oriental (Peru)

== See also ==
- Cordillera
- Orient (disambiguation)
- Cordillera Occidental (disambiguation)
- Cordillera Central (disambiguation)
- Eastern Range (disambiguation)
