= Cordillera Central =

Cordillera Central or Central Cordillera, meaning central range in Spanish, may refer to several mountain ranges:

- Cordillera Central, Andes (disambiguation), several mountain ranges in South America
  - Cordillera Central (Bolivia)
  - Cordillera Central (Colombia)
  - Cordillera Real (Ecuador)
  - Cordillera Blanca, Peru
  - Cordillera Central (Peru)
- Cordillera Central (Costa Rica)
- Cordillera Central, Dominican Republic
- Central Cordillera, New Guinea, or New Guinea Highlands
- Cordillera Central (Luzon), Philippines
- Cordillera Central (Puerto Rico)
- Cordillera Central, Spain, or Sistema Central

== See also ==
- Central Range (disambiguation)
- Cordillera Occidental (disambiguation)
- Cordillera Oriental (disambiguation)
