= Fuchsia caucana =

Scientific classification
- Kingdom: Plantae
- Clade: Tracheophytes
- Clade: Angiosperms
- Clade: Eudicots
- Clade: Rosids
- Order: Myrtales
- Family: Onagraceae
- Genus: Fuchsia
- Species: F. caucana

Binomial name
- Fuchsia caucana P.E.Berry

Species of flowering plant

Fuchsia caucana is a species of flowering plant in the family Onagraceae. It is a shrub with pink or lavender flowers and reddish purple berries. The species is native to southern Colombia, and was described in 1982.

== Taxonomy ==
The species was described by Paul Edward Berry in 1982. It is a part of the section Fuchsia, and forms part of a species group with Fuchsia petiolaris, Fuchsia corollata, Fuchsia ayavacensis, Fuchsia vulcanica, and Fuchsia ampliata.

== Distribution ==
Fuchsia caucana is native to the wet tropical biome of southern Colombia (Cauca, Huila, Nariño, Putumayo, and the Farallones de Cali).

It grows in open thickets in high elevation cloud forests on the eastern slopes of the Cordillera Central, at elevations of 2,700–3,600 metres (8,900–11,800 ft). It occurs sympatrically with Fuchsia canescens.

== Description ==
Fuchsia caucana is a shrub that grows 0.5–2 metres (1.6–6.6 ft) high. The branches are cylindrical, white, green, red, or purple, and 2–5 millimetres (0.079–0.197 in) thick.

The leaves are narrowly elliptical to lance-ovate, 3.5–7 centimetres (1.4–2.8 in) long, 1.5–3.2 centimetres (0.59–1.26 in) wide, and usually have finely toothed edges. The leaves are usually arranged in groups of three, and grow on 2–13 millimetres (0.079–0.512 in) stems.

The floral tube is narrowly funnel-shaped, 32–45 millimetres (1.3–1.8 in) long, 2–4 millimetres (0.079–0.157 in) wide at the base, and 4–11 millimetres (0.16–0.43 in) wide at the rim. The tube shape varies between populations. The sepals are lanceolate, 4–17 millimetres (0.16–0.67 in) long, and 5–6 millimetres (0.20–0.24 in) wide. The floral tube and sepals are pink or lavender in colour. The petals are 9–11 millimetres (0.35–0.43 in) long, 5–6 millimetres (0.20–0.24 in) wide, and dark red or purple in colour.

The fruit is a berry, which has four grooves before maturity. The berry is reddish-purple, 11–13 millimetres (0.43–0.51 in) long, and 7–9 millimetres (0.28–0.35 in) wide. The seeds are reddish-brown or bright red, 2–2.5 millimetres (0.079–0.098 in) long, and 1.1–1.8 millimetres (0.043–0.071 in) wide.

Fuchsia caucana has eleven pairs of chromosomes. It may hybridise with Fuchsia corollata and Fuchsia canescens.
