= Yellowstone to Yukon Conservation Initiative =

North American non-profit organisation

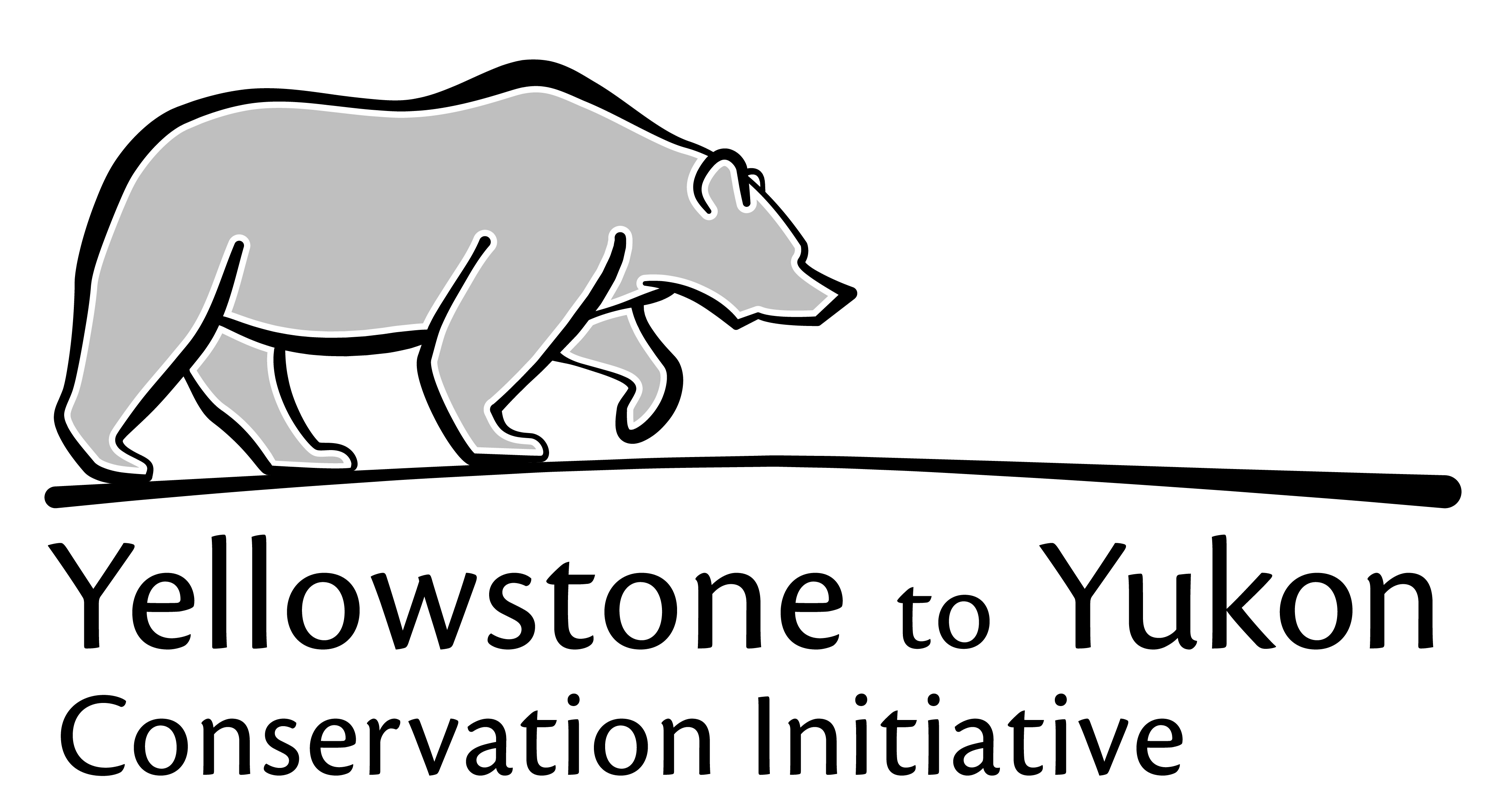

- Map of protected areas in the Y2Y region before and after 1993
- Formation: 1993
- Headquarters: Canmore, Alberta, Canada Bozeman, Montana, United States
- Official language: English
- Leader: Dr. Jodi Hilty
- Board of directors: Steve Baker; Geoff Burt; James Cross; Jonah Greenberg; Lauren Griffith; Elaine Grotefeld; Richard Harrison; Bryan Hurlbutt; Josh Johnson; Peter A. Johnson; Robert Lapper; Coral Lukaniuk; Tom McDonald; Scott Niedermayer; Robert Pratt; Pat Smith; Amy Vedder; Leslie Weldon; Germaine White; Alison Woodley; Dr. Julie Young
- Website: https://y2y.net/

Yellowstone to Yukon Conservation Initiative or Y2Y is a transboundary Canada–United States not-for-profit organization that aims to connect and protect the 2,100 miles (3,400 kilometres) Yellowstone-to-Yukon region. Its mission proposes to maintain and restore habitat integrity and connectivity along the spine of North America's Rocky Mountains stretching from the Greater Yellowstone ecosystem to Canada's Yukon Territory. It is the only organization dedicated to securing the long-term ecological health of the region.

Since 1993, more than 700 partner groups have joined forces to support the shared mission and vision. Y2Y's work is a collaborative effort of conservation groups, government agencies, Indigenous governments, landowners, wildlife scientists, planners, businesses, economists, and other individuals and groups interested in protecting native wildlife, ecological processes, and wilderness in the Rocky Mountains of North America.

Existing national, state, and provincial parks and wilderness areas anchor the system, while the creation of new protected and special management areas provide the additional cores and corridors needed to complete it. This network is built upon the principles of conservation biology, various focal species assessments, the knowledge of local and traditional residents, and the requirements for sustainable economies.

== Mission ==
Connecting and protecting habitat from Yellowstone to Yukon so people and nature can thrive.

== Primary role ==
To achieve its vision across 2,100 mi (3,400 km), Y2Y protects core wildlife habitats, keeps those habitats connected and inspires others to engage in similar work.

Y2Y highlights and focuses on local issues that have implications for the region as a whole. The organization engages in landscape-scale conservation, an approach that focuses on actions and management across large areas, such as entire watersheds.

The organization collaborates with hundreds of partners across the Rocky Mountains, including conservation groups, landowners, businesses, government agencies, Indigenous governments, scientists, and local communities. Their goal is to create a unified movement supporting large-scale land conservation that protects wildlife habitats while balancing human needs, creating corridors that allow animals to move freely and promoting coexistence between nature and communities.

== History ==
Between 1991 and 1993, Pluie, a wolf radio-collared in southern Alberta, was tracked as it traveled more than 40,000 mi^{2} (100,000 km^{2}) and covered an area 10 times the size of Yellowstone National Park and 15 times that of Banff National Park. Pluie crossed more than 30 different political jurisdictions (including three states, two provinces, private lands, and First Nation’s territories) before being shot and killed in a legal hunt south of Kootenay National Park in December 1995.

The scientific research Pluie's movements showed wildlife needed larger areas than biologists thought and pointed to a need to connect large sections of habitat along the spine of the Rocky Mountains as the best method to ensure there would be wildlife and wild spaces thriving into the future. Other animals such as lynx, cougars, golden eagles and bull trout have also been recorded traveling distances of more than 1,000 mi (1,600 km). These movements inspired people to reconsider the scale nature needs to thrive and also launched the formative idea behind Y2Y.

The Yellowstone-to-Yukon region is one of the most ambitious corridor projects on the North American continent. Since 1993, Yellowstone to Yukon's conservationists have supported wildlife crossings over and under highways, helped track wolverines and purchased more than 500,000 acres of land to preserve wildlife routes.

Yellowstone to Yukon Conservation Initiative's mission and model has inspired other similar collaborations including:

- Algonquin to Adirondacks Collaborative to connect lands and people from Algonquin Provincial Park in Ontario, Canada to the Adirondacks in New York State
- Great Eastern Ranges Initiative in Australia to connect reserves along 2,235 mi (3,597 km) of the Great Eastern Ranges
- Two Countries-One Forest to connect the Northern Appalachian-Acadian ecoregions of Canada and U.S.
- Baja to Bering Marine Initiative between Baja, California and Bering Sea off the Pacific Coast of North America

== Priorities ==
Y2Y states their mission demands a multi-pronged approach, in order to successfully work over such a challenging trans boundary landscape.

The organization engages on projects within three program areas: landscape protection, landscape connection and communities and conservation, paired with science and Indigenous knowledge and policy and government relations. Stated 2030 goals include:

1. Landscape protection: Protect 30 percent of the Yellowstone to Yukon region.
2. Landscape connection: Safeguard four key wildlife corridors by restoring animal movement across the busiest roads and advancing voluntary private land conservation.
3. Communities and conservation: Ensure communities incorporate tools and approaches that support what nature and people need at the Yellowstone to Yukon scale.
4. Policy and government relations: Work closely with communities and decision-makers to make a positive impact in the Yellowstone to Yukon region, supporting Y2Y’s vision and priority conservation outcomes shared by partners. Ensure enduring conservation by promoting a strong policy framework of laws and practices to advance Y2Y’s non-partisan policy goals at all government levels, including Indigenous, federal, state, provincial, territorial, and global.
5. Science and Indigenous knowledge: Use the best available information, including science and Indigenous and local knowledge, to guide conservation efforts in the Yellowstone to Yukon region.

== Impact on indigenous communities ==
Conservation gains from the West Moberly and Saulteau First Nations caribou partnership agreement, including the Klinse-Za Park expansion

Indigenous communities play a large role in conservation efforts through the Yellowstone to Yukon (Y2Y) region, especially though the establishment of Indigenous Protected and Conserved Areas (IPCAs) and Indigenous Protected Areas (IPAs). These initiatives aim to protect biodiversity while taking notable account of traditional territories and Indigenous communities culturally connected to land management. Historically, conservation efforts have lacked recognition of these connections, as wildlife policies in Yellowstone National Park restricted traditional Indigenous hunting practices. One example is the protection of Yukon's Peel watershed, where a plan was signed in August 2019 after 15 years of consultation, legal disputes, and community involvement. The agreement involved the government of Yukon and many first nations including the Na-Cho Nyäk Dun, Tr’ondëk Hwëch’in, and Vuntut Gwitchin, as well as the Gwich’in Tribal Council (Yellow Stone to Yukon Conservation Initiative, 2020). The plan covers 67,431 square kilometres and looks to conserve ecologically significant habitats, and preserve indigenous heritage. Another example is the 2020 agreement involving the West Moberly and Saulteau First Nations to protect caribou habitat in British Columbia, including the creation of an Indigenous protected area. These examples show how conservation initiatives in the Y2Y region contribute to not only environmental protection, but greater Indigenous participation in decision making processes of land use: an important distinction from earlier conservation approaches that sometimes excluded Indigenous communities from protected landscapes.

== Conservation Achievements ==
Protected area growth in Y2Y vs. comparison regions, 1968-2018

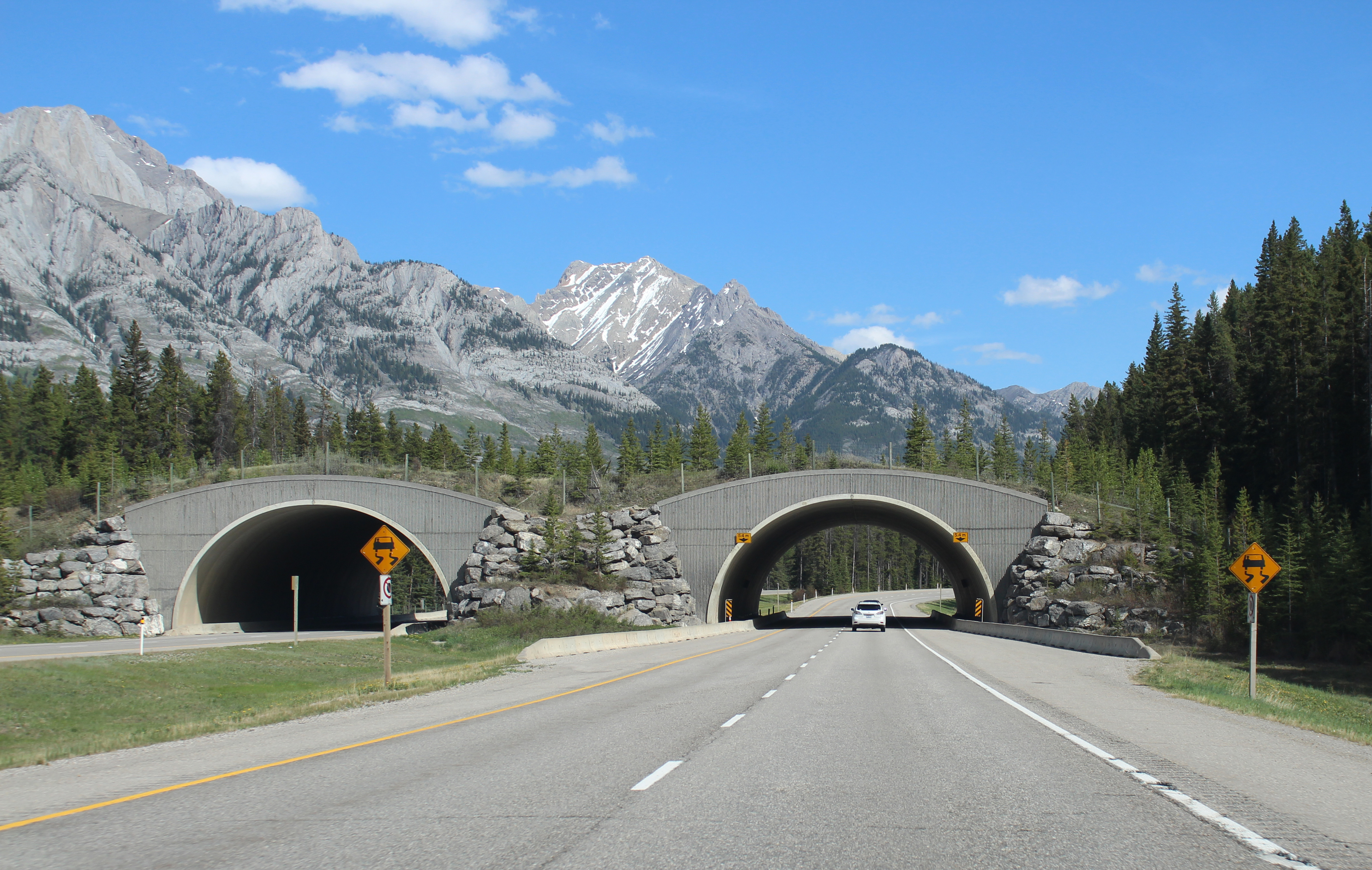
Wildlife overpass on the Trans-Canada Highway in Banff National Park

Grizzly track at the Bees to Bears wetland restoration site, northern Idaho

The success of the Yellowstone to Yukon Conservation Initiative can be measured by how well it has met its goals. Yellowstone to Yukon aims to protect and maintain wildlife for people and nature, communities and culture, and for habitats (Yellowstone to Yukon Conservation Initiative, 2020). Through collaboration with governments, Indigenous people, and local communities, Yellowstone to Yukon has created meaningful impacts while continuing to improve its efforts. Between the years of 1993 and 2018, the protected areas in the Yellowstone to Yukon region have increased by around 107,289 square kilometers (Hebbelwhite et al., 2022). The research also demonstrated that the protected areas within the Yellowstone to Yukon region increased by 90% proceeding the initiatives commencement, while growth of protected areas in surrounding regions either decreased or stayed the same. This increase helps meet wildlife maintenance goals by improving the stability of wildlife habitats and their ability to reproduce and thrive. Through collaboration with communities surrounding the Yellowstone to Yukon region, efforts have been made to make roadways safer for wildlife and citizens by adding infrastructure that allows wildlife to cross safely (Yellowstone to Yukon Conservation Initiative, 2020). Hebblewhite et al. (2022) found that developing at least 117 wildlife crossing structures in the region led to greater progress in improving connectivity within the Yellowstone-Yukon habitat. The Yellowstone to Yukon initiative has also helped restore local wildlife populations. For example, the Klinse-Za mountain Caribou population increased from only 16 in 2013 to over 200 in just a decade (Yellowstone to Yukon Conservation Initiative, 2020). These measurable achievements show progress toward the initiative’s goals of protecting wildlife populations, creating habitat connectivity, and doing so through collaboration with the surrounding community.

Research shows the Yellowstone to Yukon region is home to the world’s most intact, least developed mountain system with 15.6 percent protection. The lands for this percentage are drawn from the IUCN protected area categories.

In 2026, Y2Y was announced as one of the Earthshot Prize finalists in the Protect and Restore Nature category.

In northern Idaho's Kootenai Valley, Y2Y and Idaho Fish and Game partnered on the Bees to Bears Climate Adaptation Project, which is restoring 250 acres (101 ha) of forested lowland wetland in the Boundary-Smith Creek Wildlife Management Area to help six climate-sensitive species, including grizzly bears. [IDFG] Grizzly bears use the area regularly, especially in spring. [IDFG 2018]

== Photography and media ==
A 2005 book by Karsten Heuer, Walking the Big Wild: From Yellowstone to the Yukon on the Grizzly Bears' Trail, detailed the wildlife biologist and park warden's 18-month journey with his dog from Yellowstone National Park in Wyoming to the Canadian Yukon by hiking, skiing, and paddling across mountains, forests, and rivers.

In 2011, Yellowstone to Yukon: the Journey of Wildlife and Art, a collaborative exhibition curated by the National Museum of Wildlife Art, the Whyte Museum of the Canadian Rockies, artist Dwayne Harty, cofounder Harvey Locke and the Yellowstone to Yukon Conservation Initiative featured images, art and stories from the Yellowstone-to-Yukon region, and was eventually published as a book.

A 2016 episode of Nova titled Wild Ways featured Y2Y's work and how newly established wildlife corridors offer hope to the planet's endangered species.

== See also ==
- Algonquin to Adirondacks Collaborative
- American Prairie
- Animal migration
- Canadian Parks and Wilderness Society
- Ecology of the Rocky Mountains
- Habitat conservation
- Habitat fragmentation
- Insular biogeography
- Landscape connectivity
- Landscape-scale conservation
- National Parks of Canada
- National Park Service
- Wildlife corridor
- Wildlife crossing
