= Fuchsia cinerea =

Scientific classification
- Kingdom: Plantae
- Clade: Tracheophytes
- Clade: Angiosperms
- Clade: Eudicots
- Clade: Rosids
- Order: Myrtales
- Family: Onagraceae
- Genus: Fuchsia
- Species: F. cinerea

Binomial name
- Fuchsia cinerea P.E.Berry

Species of flowering plant

Fuchsia cinerea is a species of flowering plant in the family Onagraceae. It is a scrambling shrub with membranous leaves, orange to red flowers, and whitish, velvety berries. The species is native to Colombia and Ecuador, and was described in 1982.

== Taxonomy ==
The species was described by Paul Edward Berry in 1982. It is part of the section Fuchsia, and forms part of a species group with Fuchsia dependens, Fuchsia hirtella, Fuchsia hartwegii, Fuchsia crassistipula, and Fuchsia canescens.

== Distribution ==
Fuchsia cinerea is native to the wet tropical biome of southern Colombia and northern Ecuador. It grows at elevations of 3,100–3,250 metres (10,170–10,660 ft).

== Description ==
Fuchsia cinerea is a scrambling shrub. It grows 2–5 metres (6.6–16.4 ft) high. The branchlets are angled, and 1–2.5 millimetres (0.039–0.098 in) thick. The older branches are cylindrical, and have tan bark.

The leaves are arranged into groups of three or four, and grow on 5–12 millimetres (0.20–0.47 in) long stems. The leaves are membranous, narrowly elliptical, 2–5 centimetres (0.79–1.97 in) long, 1–2 centimetres (0.39–0.79 in) wide, and have finely toothed edges.

The flowers are hanging, and usually arranged in whorls of three or four. The flower stems are 8–20 millimetres (0.31–0.79 in) long. The flowers are narrowly funnel-shaped, 42–50 millimetres (1.7–2.0 in) long, 3–3.5 millimetres (0.12–0.14 in) wide at the base, and 5–6 millimetres (0.20–0.24 in) wide at the rim. The sepals are narrowly lanceolate, 15–19 millimetres (0.59–0.75 in) long, and 3–4 millimetres (0.12–0.16 in) wide. The petals are oblong to lanceolate, 12–15 millimetres (0.47–0.59 in) long, and 4–4.5 millimetres (0.16–0.18 in) wide. The sepals and floral tube are dull orange, and the sepals have green tips. The petals are orange to crimson.

The leaves and flowers are similar to those of Fuchsia dependens.

The fruit is a whitish, velvety, ellipsoid to subglobose berry, measuring around 12 millimetres (0.47 in) long, and around 10 millimetres (0.39 in) thick. The seeds are 1.7–1.8 millimetres (0.067–0.071 in) long, and around 1 millimetre (0.039 in) wide.

The plant has eleven pairs of chromosomes.
