= Dwayne Harty =

American painter (born 1957)

- Born: May 23, 1957 (age 69); Shaunavon, Saskatchewan
- Style: Realist-Impressionism
- Website: dwayneharty.com

Dwayne Harty (born May 23, 1957) is an American-Canadian wildlife and landscape painter. Harty has over 30 years of experience and has been called one of the best Canadian contemporary wildlife painters. Harty works out of his studio in Jackson Hole, Wyoming. Harty is a co-founder of the "Animal Art in the Park" exhibition, which is a wildlife art exhibition held annually in Algonquin Park Harty continues to teacher newer artists in the fall at the tanamakoon fall art program.

== Early life ==
Harty was born in the small prairie town of Shaunavon, Saskatchewan in 1957. Harty first started drawing wildlife on the prairies at the age of 3 years old. His family moved to Regina, Saskatchewan by the time he entered kindergarten. In his teens, Dwayne attended Campion High School.

== Training ==
By 18 years old Harty was committed to developing his skill as an artists. To achieve this goal he began working with Clarence Tillenius at the Okanagan Summer School of the Arts during his summers. The rest of his year was spent in Santa Fe, New Mexico working with Robert Lougheed. With the exception of the 2 years Dwayne spent in New York, he maintained this training for eight years. At the age of 20 Harty moved to New York City to study at the Art Students League of New York. Harty's teachers at the Art Students League of New York included; Steven Kidd, David Leffel, Thomas Fogarty Jr., Robert Beverly Hale and Terence Coyle. While in New York, Dwayne had the chance to meet the then Dean of the American animal artists, Paul Bransom. At age 27, Harty attended a Bob Kuhn Workshop in Jackson Hole, Wyoming, which would become Harty's home about 20 years later.

== Yellowstone to Yukon Conservation Initiative ==
In 2012, Harty was commissioned to join the "Yellowstone to Yukon: the Journey of Wildlife and Art" exhibition by the Yellowstone to Yukon Conservation Initiative. As part of this exhibition, Harty spent 3 years exploring some of the most remote parts of North America by horseback, truck, raft, and helicopter. Throughout this journey, Harty was able to produce a wealth of paintings, some of which were later displayed as part of the exhibit, while at least one painting was not seen publicly but was added to the private collection of Ted Turner.

== Art held in permanent collections ==
National Museum of Wildlife Art, Jackson, Wyoming, United States of America

'Pika'

'Blackfooted Ferret'

Whyte Museum of the Canadian Rockies, Banff, Alberta, Canada

'Mountain Goats'

'Lake McArthur'

Hiram Blauvelt Art Museum, Oradell, New Jersey, United States of America

'Algonquin Wolves'

'Evening Chorus'

'Canada Geess'

'Swans on the New Jersey Shore'

'Mountain Goat'

'River Otter'

'Study for "River Otter," Pencil on paper'

'Snowshoe Hare'

'Grizzly Bear'

Canadian Museum of Nature, Ottawa, Ontario, Canada

A series of 58 drawings of the squirrels of North America for the book 'The squirrels of Canada' by Shirley E. Woods held in the Library.

Shurniak Fine Art Museum, Assiniboia, Saskatchewan, Canada

'Before the Fire'

Salmagundi Club, New York, New York, United States of America

'Park Plaza Icon' - Mono-type Etching

Royal Canadian Mint, Ottawa, Ontario, Canada

8 Drawings held, 1 used for coinage, 7 used for postage stamps

== Dioramas in art institutions ==
Royal Saskatchewan Museum, Regina, Saskatchewan, Canada

Costa Rican Rain Forest diorama, 115’ around x 26’ high x 12’ deep

Mackenzie Delta Arctic diorama, 42’ around x 12’ high x 6’ deep

Hunt Falls diorama, 14’ around x 18’ high x 6’ deep

Monarch Butterfly diorama, 14’ around x 12’ high x 4’x deep

"Personal Choices" mural, 4’ high x 12’ long

Cretaceous Era miniature diorama, 10’ around x 5’ high x 2’ deep

Oligocene Era miniature diorama, 10’ around x 5’ high x 2’ deep

Miocene Era miniature diorama, 10’ around x 5’ high x 2’ deep

Pleistocene Era miniature diorama, 10’ around x 5’ high x 2’ deep

Native People's Gallery, "Youth on Horseback Race" mural, 8’ high x 16’ long

Royal Ontario Museum, Toronto, Ontario, Canada

Autumn Hardwood/Whitetail Deer diorama, 65’ around x 16’ high x 22’ deep

Long Point, Lake Erie/Waterfowl diorama, 96’ around x 12’ high x 14’ deep

Algonquin Park Visitor Center, Algonquin Park, Ontario, Canada

Summer Hardwood/Whitetail Deer diorama, 32’ around x 16’ high x 10’ deep

Algonquin Winter diorama, 32’ around x 12’ high x 12’ deep

Deciduous Forest Floor/Chipmunk diorama, 7’ around x 5’ high x 2’ deep

Spruce Bog/Wolf diorama, 32" around x 12’ high x 10’ deep

Rock Lake/Cow and Calf Moose diorama, 16’ around x 10’ high x 5’ deep

Moose mural/Opeongo Lake Road Hillside, 12’ high x 22’ long

Wye Marsh Conservation Area Visitor Center, Midland, Ontario, Canada

Winter, Spring, Summer, and Fall Murals depicting seasonal flora and fauna of the Wye Marsh habitats Each mural measuring 8’ high x 12’ long

West Parry Sound District Museum, Parry Sound, Ontario, Canada

Georgian Bay Shoreline/Lighthouse mural, 8’ high x 20’ long

Manitoba Museum of Man and Nature, Winnipeg, Manitoba

Assistant to Clarence Tillenius in completion of the Boreal Forest/Moose diorama, 16 ‘ high x 52’ around x 16’ deep

Western Development Museum, Saskatoon, Saskatchewan, Canada

Prairie Homesteading, Sod Hut and Farm, 16' x 42'

Metis Harvest Celebration, 12'x24'

Dirty 30's Dust Storm, 16'x30'

Cree Nation of Chisasibi Cultural Center, Chisasibi, Quebec, Canada

Black Bear Winter Hibirnation, 12'x24'

Mayor Square, Troutdale Oregon, United States of America

Troutdale Oregon Historical Mural, 12'x24'

== Awards and notable works ==
- Whyte Museum of the Canadian Rockies, Banff, Alberta Artist in Residence (2012)
- Jackson Hole Fall Art Festival Featured Artist (2011)
- Society of animal Artists 35th Annual Exhibition 'Leonard J. Meiselman Award for Representational Art'. for his painting titled "Algongquin Wolves". (1995)
- Hiram Blauvelt Art Museum, Oradell, New Jersey, Artist in Residence (1994)
- Nature works exhibition, Tulsa, Oklahoma, International Artist of the Year (1994)
- Nature works exhibition, Tulsa, Oklahoma, Award of Merit (1994)
- Society of Animal Artists, Award of Excellence.
- Art and the Animal annual exhibition Medal and Award for "OTTER". (1993)
- Saskatchewan Arts Board study award. (1981)
- Member: Society of Animal Artists, New York. (Member since 1980)
- Canada Council grant for study (1978)
- Canadian Nature Federation study scholarship (1977)
