= Fuchsia canescens =

Scientific classification
- Kingdom: Plantae
- Clade: Tracheophytes
- Clade: Angiosperms
- Clade: Eudicots
- Clade: Rosids
- Order: Myrtales
- Family: Onagraceae
- Genus: Fuchsia
- Species: F. canescens

Binomial name
- Fuchsia canescens Benth.

Species of flowering plant

Fuchsia canescens is a species of flowering plant in the family Onagraceae. It is a shrub with membranous leaves, red to orange flowers, and green to purple berries. The species is native to Colombia, and was described in 1845.

== Taxonomy ==
Fuchsia canescens was described by George Bentham in 1845. It is part of the section Fuchsia, and forms part of a species group with Fuchsia dependens, Fuchsia hirtella, Fuchsia hartwegii, Fuchsia crassistipula, and Fuchsia cinerea.

Philip Alexander Munz treated Fuchsia canescens as a synonym of Fuchsia corollata.

== Distribution ==
Fuchsia canescens is native to the wet tropical biome of south Colombia (Cauca, Huila, and Nariño). It grows in cloud forests, at elevations of 2,800–3,350 metres (9,190–10,990 ft).

Fuchsia canescens occurs sympatrically with Fuchsia corollata and Fuchsia caucana.

== Description ==
Fuchsia canescens is a shrub that grows 1.5–4 metres (4.9–13.1 ft) high. The young branches are ridged, reddish, and 3–8 millimetres (0.12–0.31 in) thick. The older branches have tan bark.

The leaves are firmly membranous, elliptical to obovate, 4.5–10 centimetres (1.8–3.9 in) long, and 2–5 centimetres (0.79–1.97 in) wide. The leaf stems are dull purple, and 15–25 millimetres (0.59–0.98 in) long.

The flowers may be arranged in racemes. The flower stems are 5–13 millimetres (0.20–0.51 in) long. The floral tubes are dull scarlet or orange red, thick, spongy, narrowly funnel-shaped, 34–50 millimetres (1.3–2.0 in) long, 3.5–5.5 millimetres (0.14–0.22 in) wide at the base, and 5–9 millimetres (0.20–0.35 in) wide at the rim. The petals are dark red, trowel-shaped, 14–19 millimetres (0.55–0.75 in) long, 4–7 millimetres (0.16–0.28 in) wide, and have slightly undulating margins. The sepals are triangular, 14–18 millimetres (0.55–0.71 in) long, 6–9 millimetres (0.24–0.35 in) wide, and white or greenish at the tips.

The fruit is an ellipsoid, green to purple berry, measuring 12–25 millimetres (0.47–0.98 in) long, and 8–10 millimetres (0.31–0.39 in) thick. The seeds are around 1.5 millimetres (0.059 in) long, and 0.6–0.8 millimetres (0.024–0.031 in) wide. The plant has eleven pairs of chromosomes.

Fuchsia canescens may hybridise with Fuchsia caucana.

== Uses ==
Fuchsia canescens is used for food and medicine.
