= The Range =

The Range may refer to:

== People ==
- The Range (musician), the professional name for electronic musician James Hinton
- Bruce Hornsby and the Range, a musical group

== Places ==
- The Range, Queensland, a locality in Australia
  - The Range Convent and High School
- The Range, South Australia, a locality in Australia
- The Range (University of Virginia), a building at the University of Virginia

== Other ==
- The Range (retailer), a British retail company

== See also ==
- Range (disambiguation)
