= Fuchsia corymbiflora =

Scientific classification
- Kingdom: Plantae
- Clade: Tracheophytes
- Clade: Angiosperms
- Clade: Eudicots
- Clade: Rosids
- Order: Myrtales
- Family: Onagraceae
- Genus: Fuchsia
- Species: F. corymbiflora

Binomial name
- Fuchsia corymbiflora Ruiz & Pav.

Synonyms
- Fuchsia corymbiflora var. alba Harrison; Fuchsia corymbosa Pritz.; Fuchsia munzii J.F.Macbr.; Fuchsia velutina I.M.Johnst.

Species of plant

Fuchsia corymbiflora is a species of shrub in the family Onagraceae. It is endemic to Peru, and was first introduced to the Royal Botanical Gardens, Kew in 1840.

This species is often confused with Fuchsia boliviana, which it closely resembles. On close inspection, most plants in cultivation identified as F. corymbiflora turn out to be the latter. The most immediately visible distinction is that the sepals of F. boliviana initially become spreading at anthesis but soon fully reflex back against the tube. The sepals of F. corymbiflora, on the hand, spread at anthesis but remain in a more angled position. They do not fully reflex.

== Etymology ==
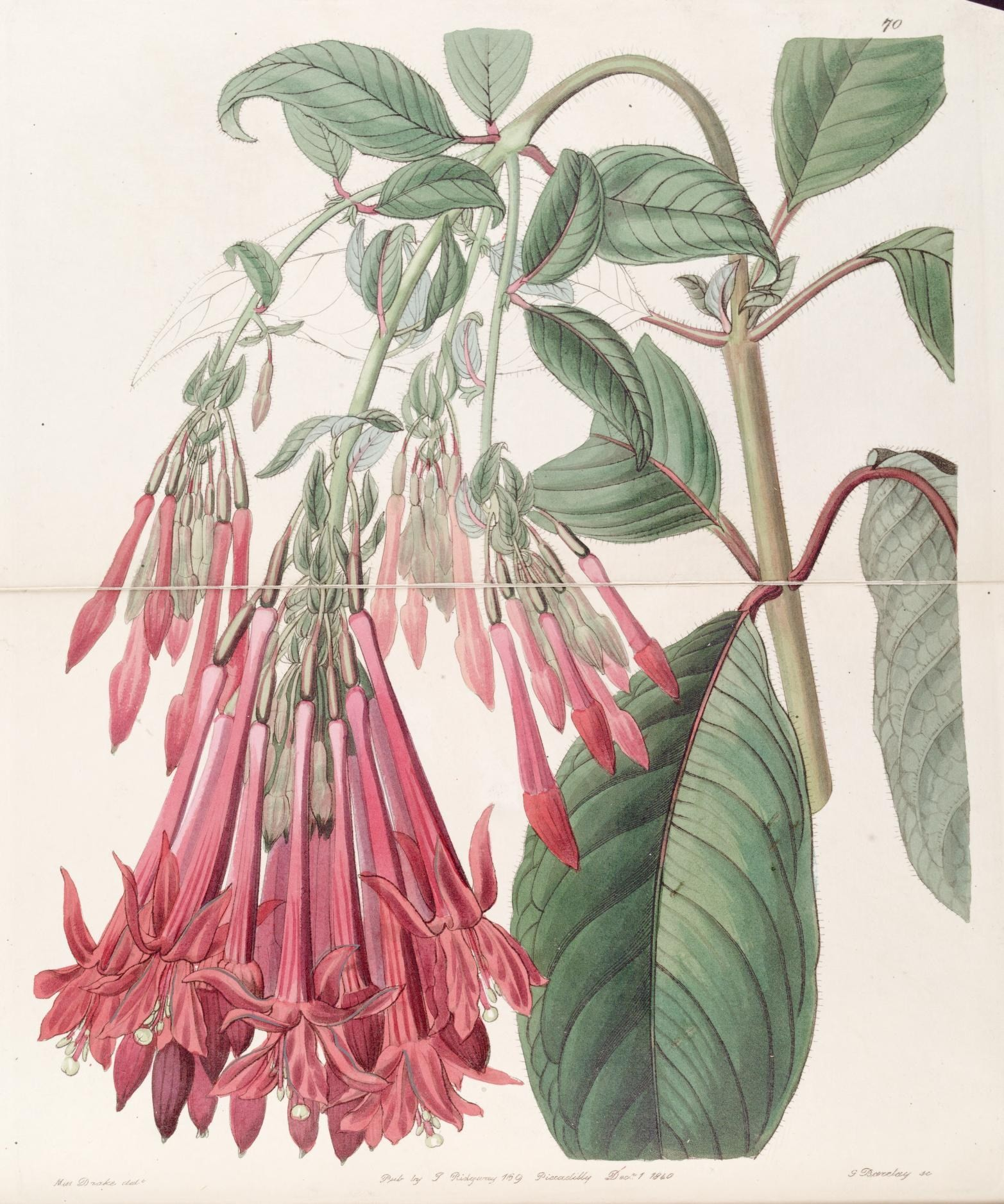
Illustration made in 1840

Fuchsia is named for Leonhart Fuchs [1501-66], a renaissance botanist and professor at Tübingen. Corymbiflora means 'with flowers arranged in flat-topped heads (corymbs)'.
