= Central Range =

Central Range, Central Mountains, or Central Mountain Range may refer to several ranges of mountains, including:

- Central Range, New Guinea
- Central Range, Taiwan
- Central Range, Trinidad and Tobago

== See also ==
- Central Ranges
- Central Ranges (wine)
- Central Ranges xeric scrub
- Cordillera Central (disambiguation), Spanish for "Central Range"
