= Algonquin to Adirondacks Collaborative =

Environmental non-governmental organization

- Formation: 2002; 24 years ago
- Headquarters: Lansdowne, Ontario, Canada
- Members: 150
- Executive Director: Jess Lax
- Website: www.a2acollaborative.org

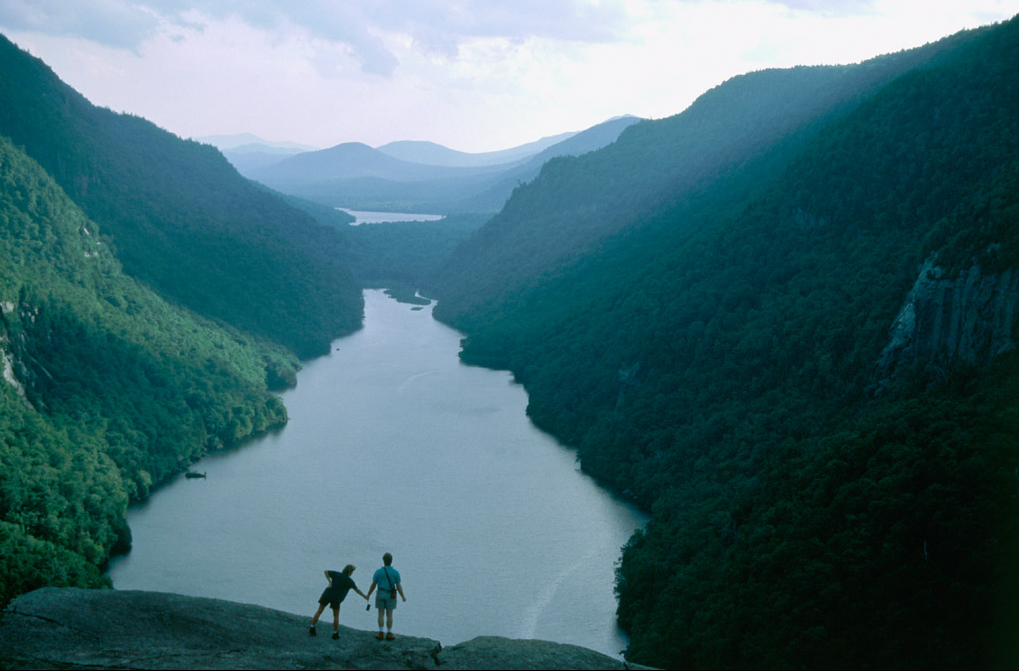
Adirondacks High Peaks

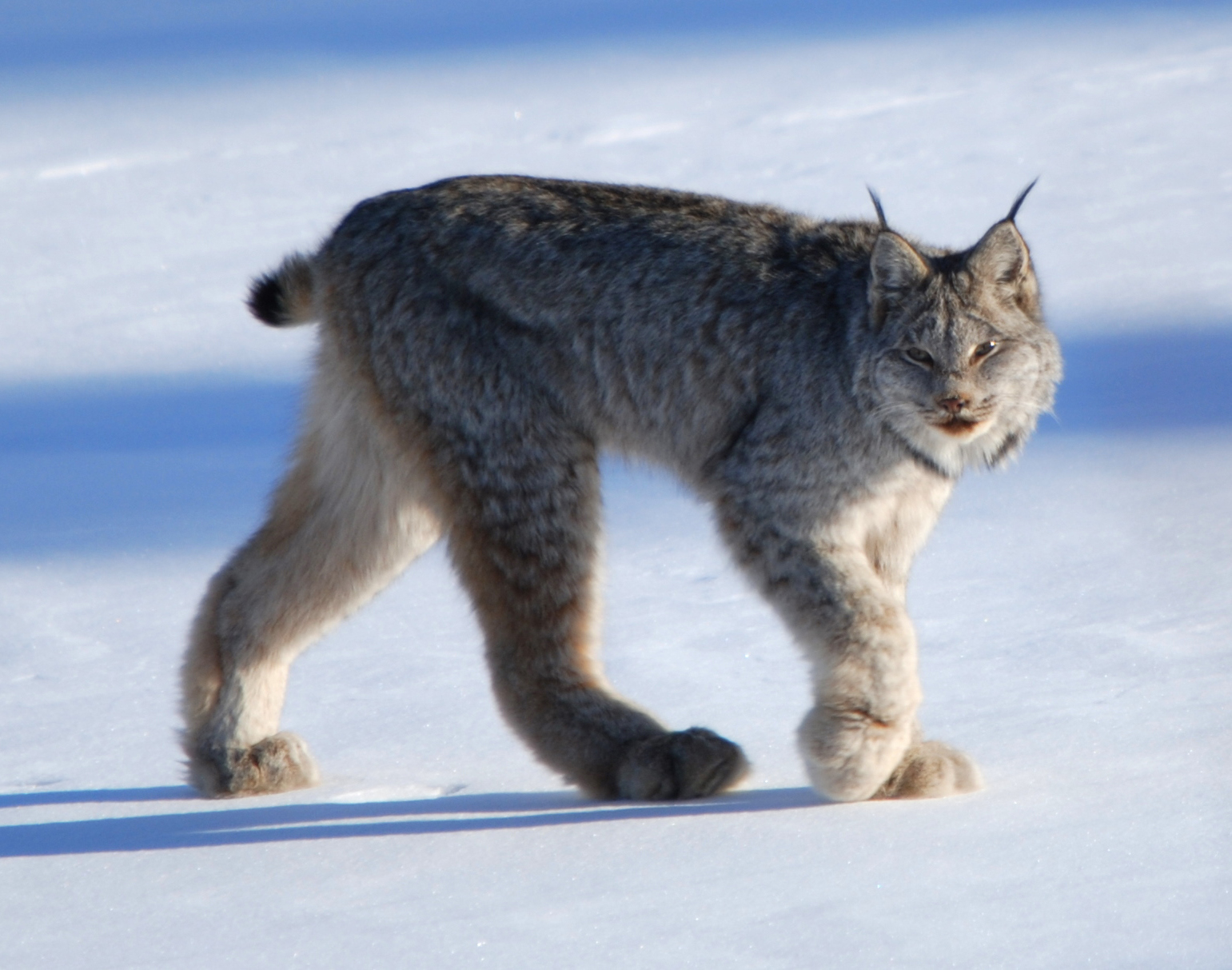
Canadian lynx

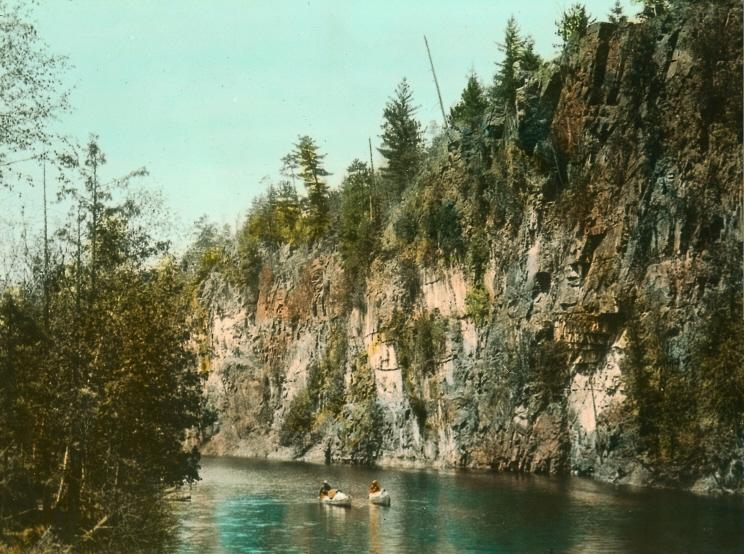
Canoeing in Algonquin Park

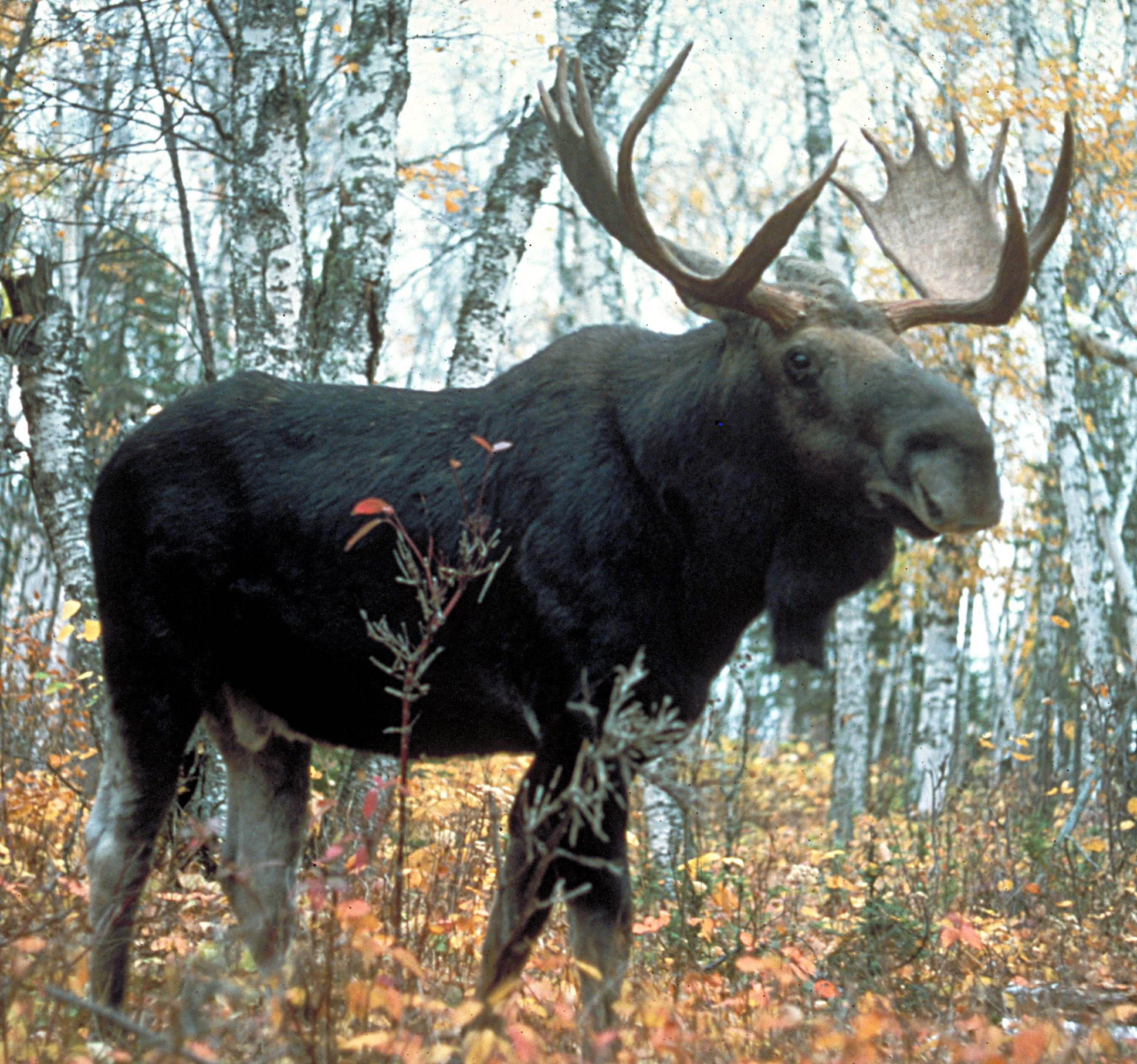
Bull moose

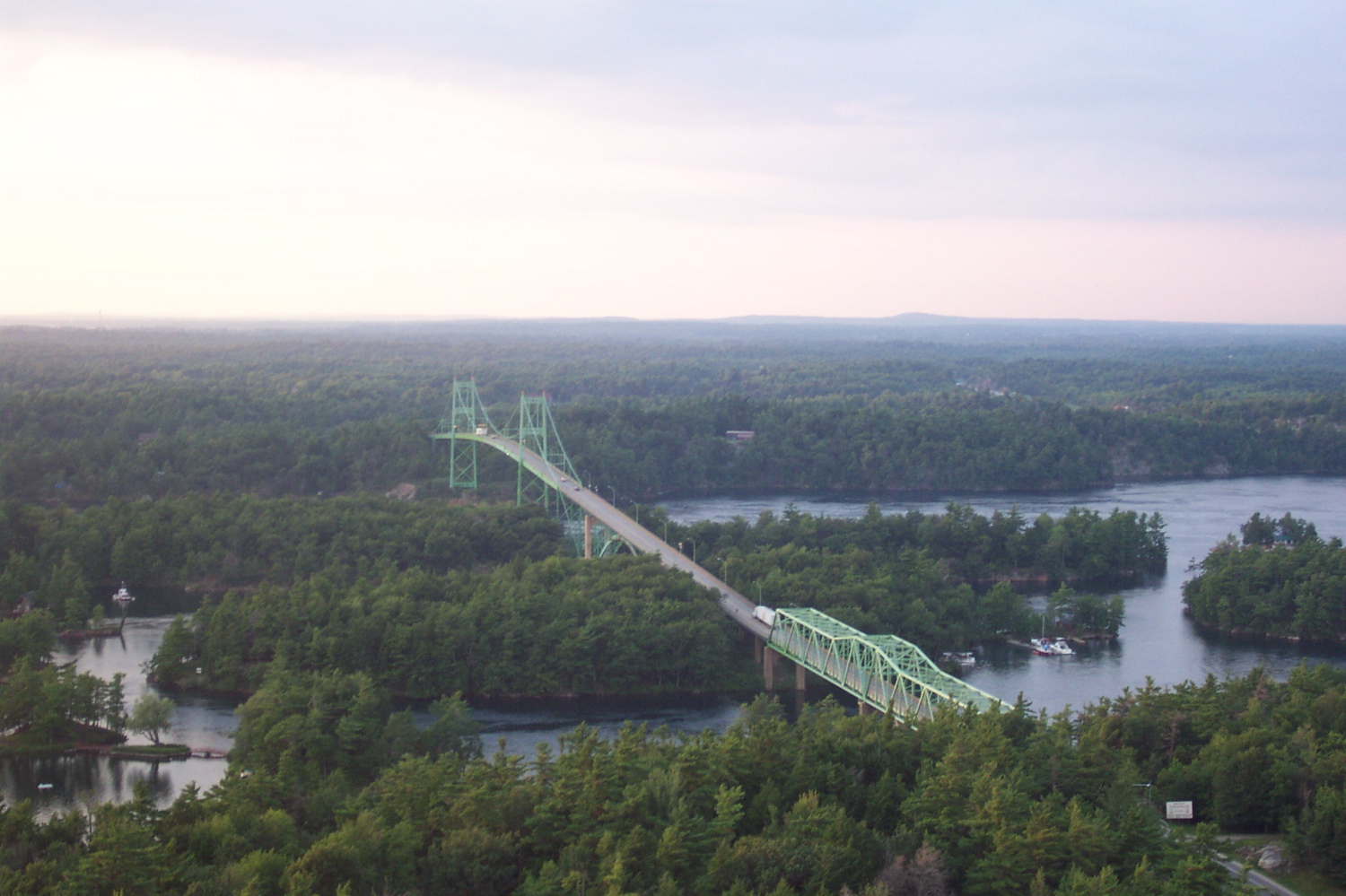
Thousand Islands Bridge

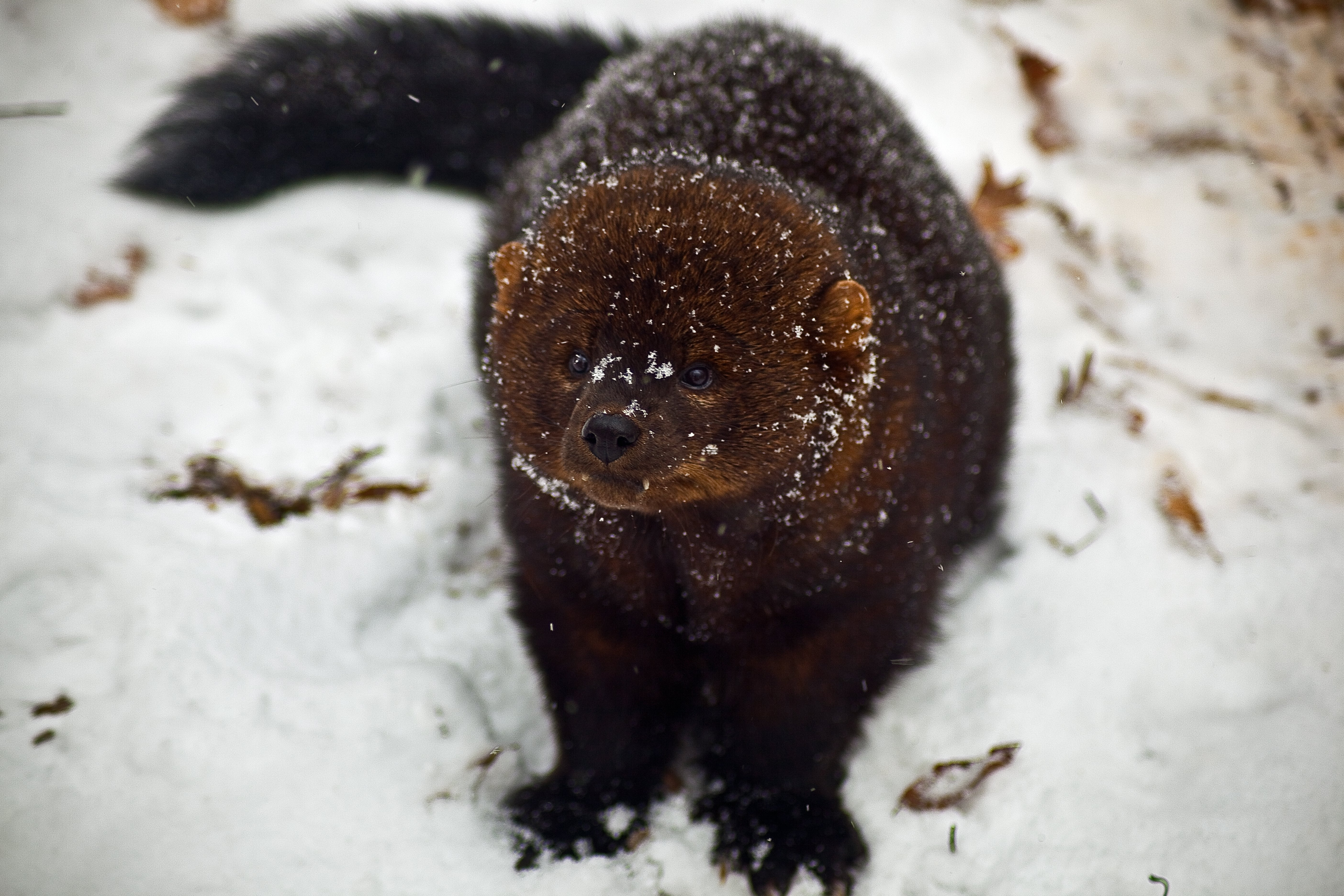
Fisher

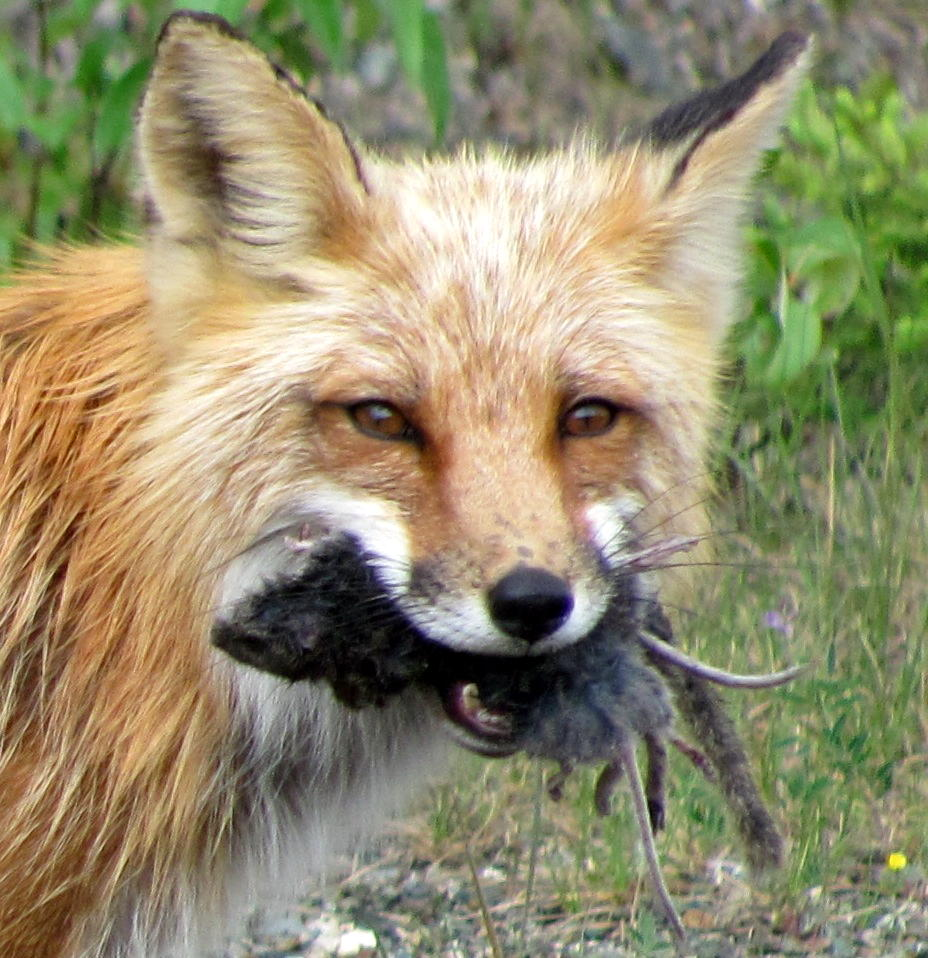
Red fox in Canada

The Algonquin to Adirondacks Collaborative (A2A) is an environmental NGO, a registered charity, and a not-for-profit multi-national (Canada, United States, First Nations). This network of partners works together to connect lands and people from Algonquin Provincial Park in Ontario, Canada, to the Adirondacks in New York State. The Algonquin to Adirondacks region represents a critical link for biodiversity and resilience in North America.

== History ==
In the 1990s, the Ottawa Valley chapter of the Canadian Parks and Wilderness Society convened a committee to discuss a landscape conservation effort to ensure ecological connectivity and help restore biodiversity from Algonquin Park to the Adirondacks, along the Frontenac Arch. The Algonquin to Adirondacks (A2A) Conservation Association (now Collaborative) was incorporated in 2002 to enhance habitat connectivity and maintain native biodiversity in the region. The organization is similar to its sister conservation corridor in western North America, the Yellowstone to Yukon Conservation Initiative, and Two Countries, One Forest (a project of the Wildlife Conservation Society), in conducting landscape conservation work across international boundaries.

In the first decade (2002–2012) the A2A Conservation Association worked to support partner organizations, and conduct projects with their help, on the Canadian side of the Thousand Islands region of the St. Lawrence River. This area was strategic because it is the pinch point of the A2A Region and the communities on the Canadian side were very engaged in conservation efforts. Projects included water quality analyses, shoreline analyses, and creating resources for landowners.

During two visioning workshops in 2012, partners identified the need for the A2A Conservation Association to be reimagined as a Collaborative. This led to a change in name and organizational structure. In response to the notable lack of American representation, partners also called for the A2A Collaborative to better embody its name by becoming a less local and more regional initiative with more American representation. Concerted outreach led to new American partners and American members of the Board of Directors. In 2014, the A2A Collaborative received capacity-building support from the Ontario Trillium Foundation to hire a full-time coordinator and hold partner events. The inaugural A2A Collaborative Partner Meeting in Brockville, Ontario, March 29–30, 2014, saw 42 participants representing 31 different organizations across the A2A Region.

== Biodiversity ==
Mammals: In the A2A Region there are an estimated 54 species, including wolf, marten, lynx, moose, black bear, ermine, fisher, and grey fox, which is considered threatened.

Birds: More than 165 confirmed species of breeding birds in the region—eight vulnerable species and two endangered. As a result, 60% of the area falls into the highest possible class for number of species (>104 species/100 km^{2}).

Reptiles: 17 species, five of which are uncommon.

Plants: 81 rare species, including sedges, orchids, cacti, legumes, asters, gentians, ferns, and half of Canada's remaining population of wild ginseng.

== Vision ==
The A2A Collaborative's vision is of "an A2A region comprising a resilient, ecologically interconnected landscape that sustains a full range of native wildlife and enhances people's quality of life for generations to come."

== Recognition ==
In 2004, the A2A Collaborative was recognized by the North American Native Plant Society, with the Paul McGaw Memorial Conservation Award, for its efforts to maintain and restore the natural connectivity for flora and fauna.

In 2010, the A2A Collaborative was recognized by Ontario Nature, with the Steve Hounsell Greenway Award, for its major contributions toward the Greenway vision.

== Challenges ==
- Reducing habitat fragmentation
- Fostering landowner enthusiasm and commitment
- Sustaining organizational capacity
- Shifting from a local focus to a more regional perspective
- Making concrete progress toward the vision

== Projects ==
Connectivity Analysis: In partnership with the Ontario Ministry of Natural Resources, and supported by the McLean Foundation, the A2A Collaborative is currently conducting a connectivity analysis of the A2A Region to help prioritize conservation efforts. Examples of such efforts include land trust purchases or conservation easements, species-at-risk programs, and landowner education.

Highway 401 Wildlife Crossings: In partnership with the Ontario Road Ecology Group, and supported by the Ontario Ministry of Natural Resources's Species At Risk Fund, the A2A Collaborative is identifying the most important areas for wildlife crossings to be built or enhanced. This work is being done along highway 401 between Gananoque and Mallorytown, where the parallel St. Lawrence River is narrow and north-south migration is most feasible.

A2A Trail: A new project to build a hiking trail from Algonquin to Adirondacks parks with the goals of fostering an identity for the region, recreational possibilities, increased human well-being, and local economic activity.

== See also ==
- Canadian Parks and Wilderness Society
- Landscape scale conservation
- National Parks of Canada
- Yellowstone to Yukon Conservation Initiative
