= Cordillera Central, Andes =

There are several Cordillera Central mountain ranges in the Andes Mountains of South America:

- Cordillera Blanca or Cordillera Central in the Ancash Region
- Cordillera Central, Bolivia
- Cordillera Central, Colombia
- Cordillera Central, Ecuador
- Cordillera Central, Peru in the Junín Region and in the Lima Region
