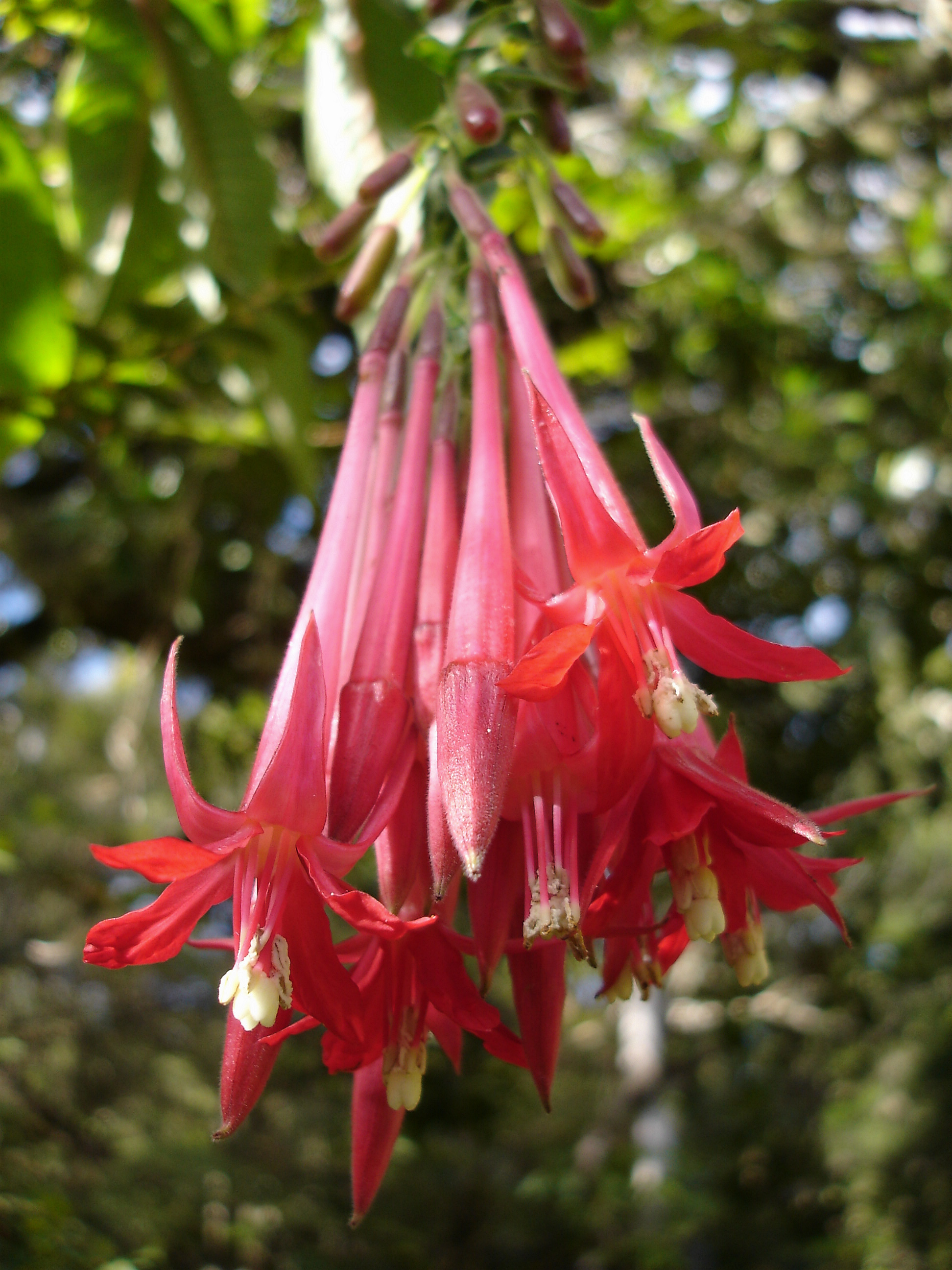

Conservation status
- Least Concern (IUCN 3.1)

Scientific classification
- Kingdom: Plantae
- Clade: Tracheophytes
- Clade: Angiosperms
- Clade: Eudicots
- Clade: Rosids
- Order: Myrtales
- Family: Onagraceae
- Genus: Fuchsia
- Species: F. boliviana

Binomial name
- Fuchsia boliviana Carrière

= Fuchsia boliviana =

Species of plant

Fuchsia boliviana is a species of Fuchsia native to southern Peru, Bolivia and northern Argentina.

== Description ==
It is a medium evergreen shrub, growing to 2–4 m tall, rarely to 6 m, with a spreading, open habit. It has large, hairy mid-green leaves and red petioles. It has large drooping corymbs up to 20 cm long borne in late summer and autumn of scarlet red flowers with the individual flowers 3–7 cm long. A white-flowering form exists named 'Alba', with a white tube and scarlet petals. After flowering it bears small red-purple, edible fruit 10–26 mm long.

Fuchsia boliviana is widely grown in shade or part-shade in cooler, subtropical climates. Plants require protection from direct sun and temperatures exceeding 40 °C. The plants are hardy to about −4 °C for short periods. Propagation is by seed or cuttings.
