= Range, Ohio =

- Unincorporated community
- Location within Ohio Location within the United States
- Coordinates: 39°43′55″N 83°25′29″W
- Country: United States
- State: Ohio
- Counties: Madison
- Township: Range
- Elevation: 1,014 ft (309 m)
- Time zone: UTC-5 (Eastern (EST))
  - Summer (DST): UTC-4 (EDT)
- ZIP Codes: 43140 (London); 43143 (Mount Sterling)
- Area code: 740
- GNIS feature ID: 1070908

Range is an unincorporated community in Range Township, Madison County, Ohio, United States. It is located between Chenoweth and Midway.

The Range Post office was established on September 2, 1872, but was discontinued on December 14, 1905. The mail service is now sent through the London branch.
