= Range =

Range may refer to:

== Geography ==
- Mountain range, a chain of hills or mountains; a somewhat linear, complex mountainous or hilly area (cordillera, sierra)
- Range, a term used to identify a survey township in the US
- Rangeland, deserts, grasslands, shrublands, wetlands, and woodlands that are grazed by domestic livestock or wild animals

== Mathematics ==
- Range of a function, a set containing the output values produced by a function
- Range (statistics), the difference between the highest and the lowest values in a set
- Range of an interval, the diameter of an interval
- Column space, also called the range of a matrix, is the set of all possible linear combinations of the column vectors of the matrix
- Projective range, a line or a conic in projective geometry
- Range of a quantifier, in logic

== Music ==
- Range (music), the distance from the lowest to the highest pitch musical instruments can play
- Vocal range, the breadth of pitches that a human voice can phonate

== People ==
- Erik Range (born 1977), German computer games developer, journalist and YouTube personality
- Harald Range (1948–2018), Attorney General of Germany
- Heidi Range (born 1983), British singer and songwriter
- M. Athalie Range (1915–2006), American civil rights activist and politician
- Rosslyn Range (1933–2021), American long jumper

== Places ==
- Range, Alabama, an unincorporated community
- Range, Ohio, an unincorporated community
- Range, Wisconsin, an unincorporated community
- Range Township, Madison County, Ohio

== Science ==
- Range (biology), the geographical area where a species can be found
- Range (particle radiation), the distance a charged particle travels before stopping

== Technology ==
- Range (aeronautics), the distance an aircraft can fly
- Range (computer programming), the set of allowed values for a variable
- Range, any kitchen stove with multiple burners, especially in the United States
- All-electric range, the driving range of a vehicle using only power from its electric battery pack
- Range of a projectile, the potential distance a projectile can be hurled by a firearm or cannon
- Slant range, distance between two objects on different levels

== Other uses ==
- Range, in navigational transit, is a pair of navigational beacons whose line indicates a channel; if lighted, they are called range lights (in the US), or leading lights (in the UK)
- Bombing range, where combat aircraft practise attacking ground targets
- Driving range, where golfers practice their swing
- Shooting range, where gun shooters or archers shoot at targets
- Range anxiety, fear that a vehicle has insufficient range to reach its destination
- Range factor (commonly abbreviated RF), a baseball statistic
- Rocket engine test facility, or rocket test range
- Range: Why Generalists Triumph in a Specialized World, 2019 book by David Epstein

== See also ==
- Rangefinder
- Ranger (disambiguation)
- The Range (disambiguation)
