= Cordillera Occidental (Ecuador) =

Mountain range in the Andes in Ecuador

Coordinates: 1.46917°S 78.8175°W

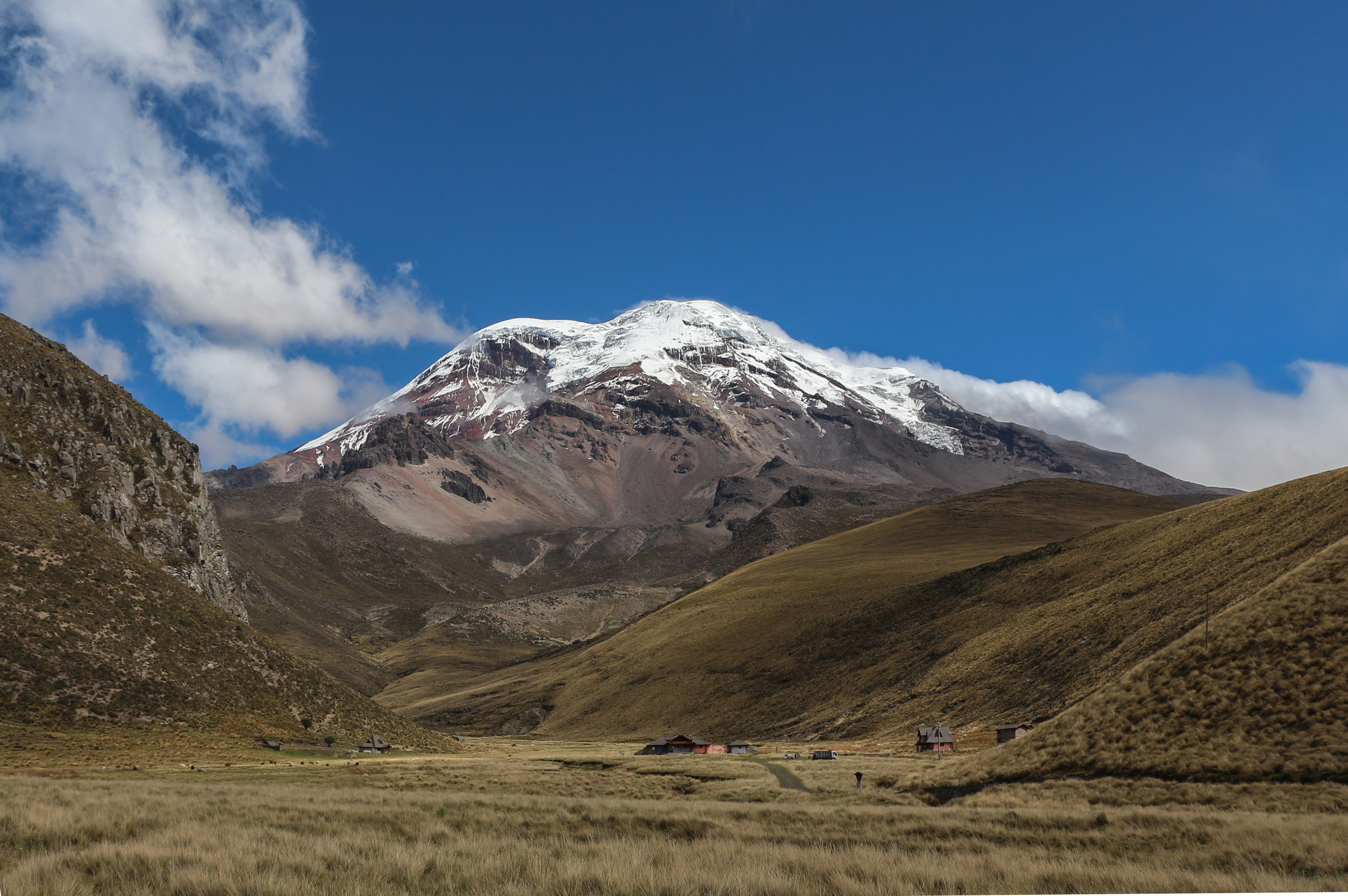
The Chimborazo

The Cordillera Occidental range is one of two main mountain ranges in the Andes in Ecuador, the other being the Cordillera Central. It spans the whole country from north to south. The highest peak of the Cordillera Occidental is Chimborazo (6,267 metres (20,561 ft)). The range extends from south to north dividing from the Colombian Massif in Nariño Department, passes north through Cauca, Valle del Cauca, Risaralda, Chocó, and Caldas Departments to the Paramillo Massif in Antioquia and Córdoba Departments.

== See also ==
- Cordillera Central (Ecuador)
- Cordillera Occidental (disambiguation)
