= Great Eastern Ranges =

Mountains in Australia

Coordinates: 29°27′41.62″S 152°18′59.55″E

The Great Eastern Ranges extends from southern Victoria to north of Cairns in Queensland, Australia. It encompasses the Great Dividing Range and the Great Escarpment – two ancient mountain systems, along with undulating terrain and occasional tablelands on the eastern side of the continent.

== History ==
The Great Eastern ranges initiative was established in July 2007 with support from the new South Wales Environmental Trust. Early funding helped launch the initiative as a large-scale connectivity program focused on linking habitats along easter Australia and supporting restoration beyond the boundaries of existing protected areas.

In its early years, the initiative was developed through partnerships between government agencies, conservation organisations, researches, and community groups. By 2007-08, community partnership programs had already been established in the southern of the corridor, including Kosciuszko ton Coast and Slopes to Summit, reflecting the project's on regionally based collaboration.

The initiative later evolved from a New South Wales Government-led program into a broader partnership model involving non-government organisations, community groups, and state agencies. This transition reflected the increasing recognition that long-term landscape connectivity required cooperation across land tenures and jurisdictions.

== Geography and ecological significance ==
The Great Eastern Ranges extend for more than 3,600 kilometres along eastern Australia, from the Grampians in Victoria through New South Wales and the Australian Capital Territory to Cape York in far north Queensland. It includes parts of the Great Dividing Range and Great Escarpment and spans a wide variety ofn landscapes, including forests, woodlands, uplands, and tablelands.

The corridor is regarded as ecologically significant because it supports habitat connectivity across one of the most biodiverse parts of the continent. Its scale allows native species to move between habitats, which is especially important in landscapes fragmented by clearing and other land-use change. Thisn connectivity is also considered important for helping ecosystems and wildlife respond to climate variability and long environmental change.

The Great Eastern Ranges has also been identified in Australian conservation plannign as a major connectivity corridor of national significance. Government and conservation sources have described it as part of a broader landscape-scale approach to biodiversity conservation, linking protected areas with private and public lands outside reserves.

== The Great Eastern Ranges initiative ==
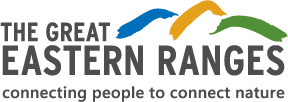
GER logo

The Great Eastern Ranges (GER) is a large landscape connectivity conservation initiative established in 2007. It was created to address habitat degradation, loss, and fragmentation across eastern Australia.

Although parts of the Great Eastern Ranges are well protected by national parks and reserves, much of the rich biodiversity along the ranges is found on private and public lands outside of protected areas. Research shows that the conventional approach of prioritizing the conservation of isolated patches of habitat in national parks is not sufficient by itself to ensure the long-term survival and adaptability of wildlife populations and the resilience and integrity of ecosystems – connectivity (the degree to which landscapes and seascapes allow species to move freely and ecological processes to function unimpeded) between landscapes and natural systems is critical.

GER takes a community-led approach to conservation. Through the organization's regionally based partnerships, GER engages landholders and local communities in projects that protect, connect, and regenerate priority landscapes and ecosystems. These landscapes have been selected through spatial analysis on the basis that they contain important habitat connections and climate refugia for wildlife, and the high diversity of plants and animals that occur within them.

== Regional Partners of GER ==
- Biolinks Alliance
- Blue Mountains City Council
- Border Ranges Alliance
- Greater Sydney Landcare
- Hinterland Bush Links
- Hunter GER
- Illawarra to Shoalhaven Connectivity Forum
- Jaliigirr Biodiversity Alliance
- Kanangra-Boyd to Wyangala Link
- Kosciusko to Coast (K2C)
- Lockyer Uplands Catchments
- North East Bioregional Network
- The Slopes to Summit (S2S) partnership
- The Southern Highlands Link partnership
