= Cordillera Occidental =

Cordillera Occidental is Spanish for "Western mountain". It may refer to:

- Cordillera Occidental (Colombia)
- Cordillera Occidental (Ecuador)
- Cordillera Occidental (Peru)
- Cordillera Occidental (Bolivia)

== See also ==
- Sierra Madre Occidental, the Western mountain range in Mexico
- North American Cordillera, the Western mountain range in North America
- Cordillera Central (disambiguation)
- Cordillera Oriental (disambiguation)
