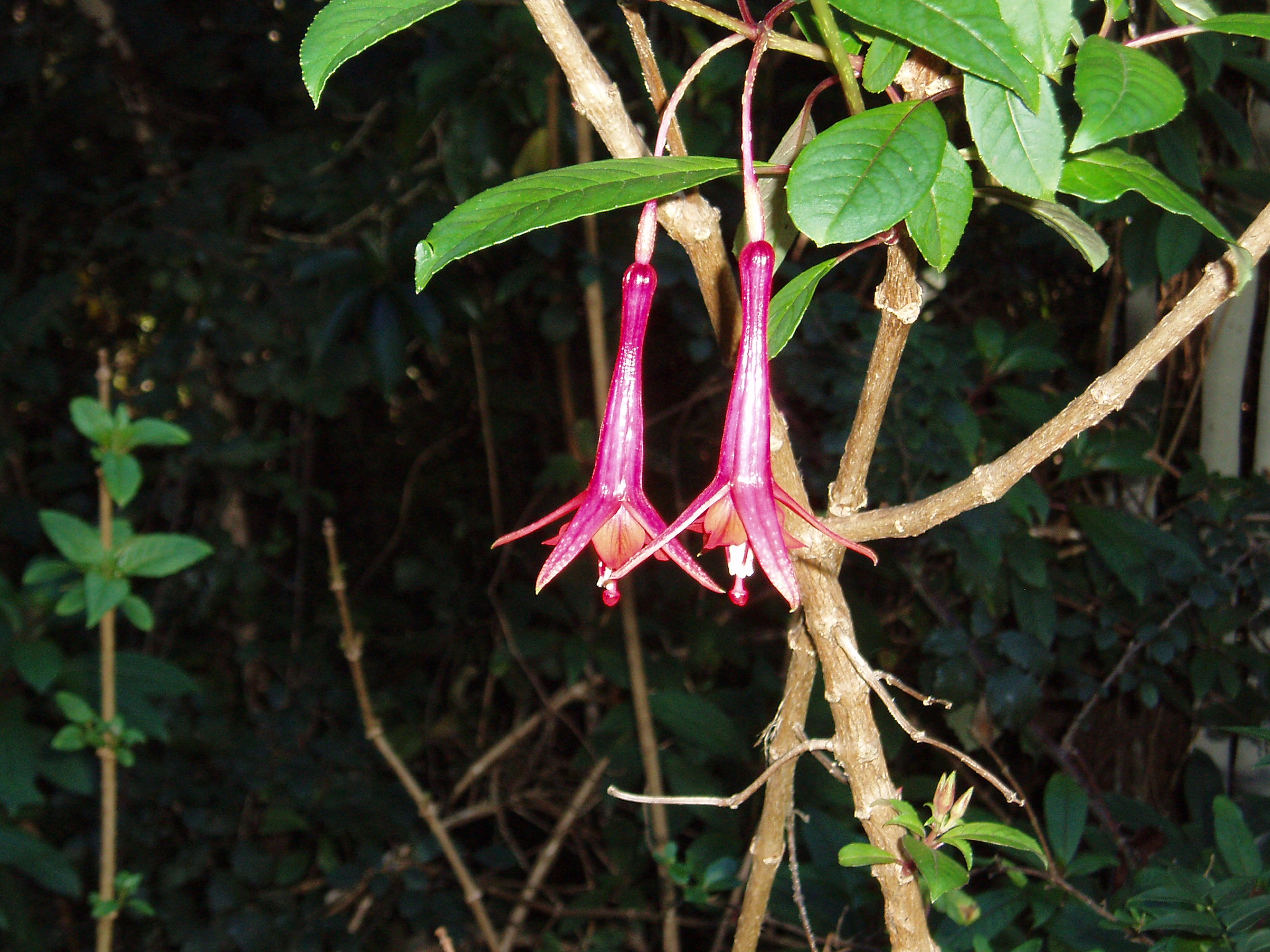

Conservation status
- Least Concern (IUCN 3.1)

Scientific classification
- Kingdom: Plantae
- Clade: Tracheophytes
- Clade: Angiosperms
- Clade: Eudicots
- Clade: Rosids
- Order: Myrtales
- Family: Onagraceae
- Genus: Fuchsia
- Species: F. denticulata

Binomial name
- Fuchsia denticulata Ruiz & Pav.

Synonyms
- Fuchsia leptopoda E.H.L.Krause; Fuchsia serratifolia Ruiz & Pav.; Fuchsia siphonantha E.H.L.Krause; Fuchsia tacsoniiflora E.H.L.Krause

= Fuchsia denticulata =

Species of plant

Fuchsia denticulata is a species of shrub in the family Onagraceae. It is native to Bolivia and Peru.
