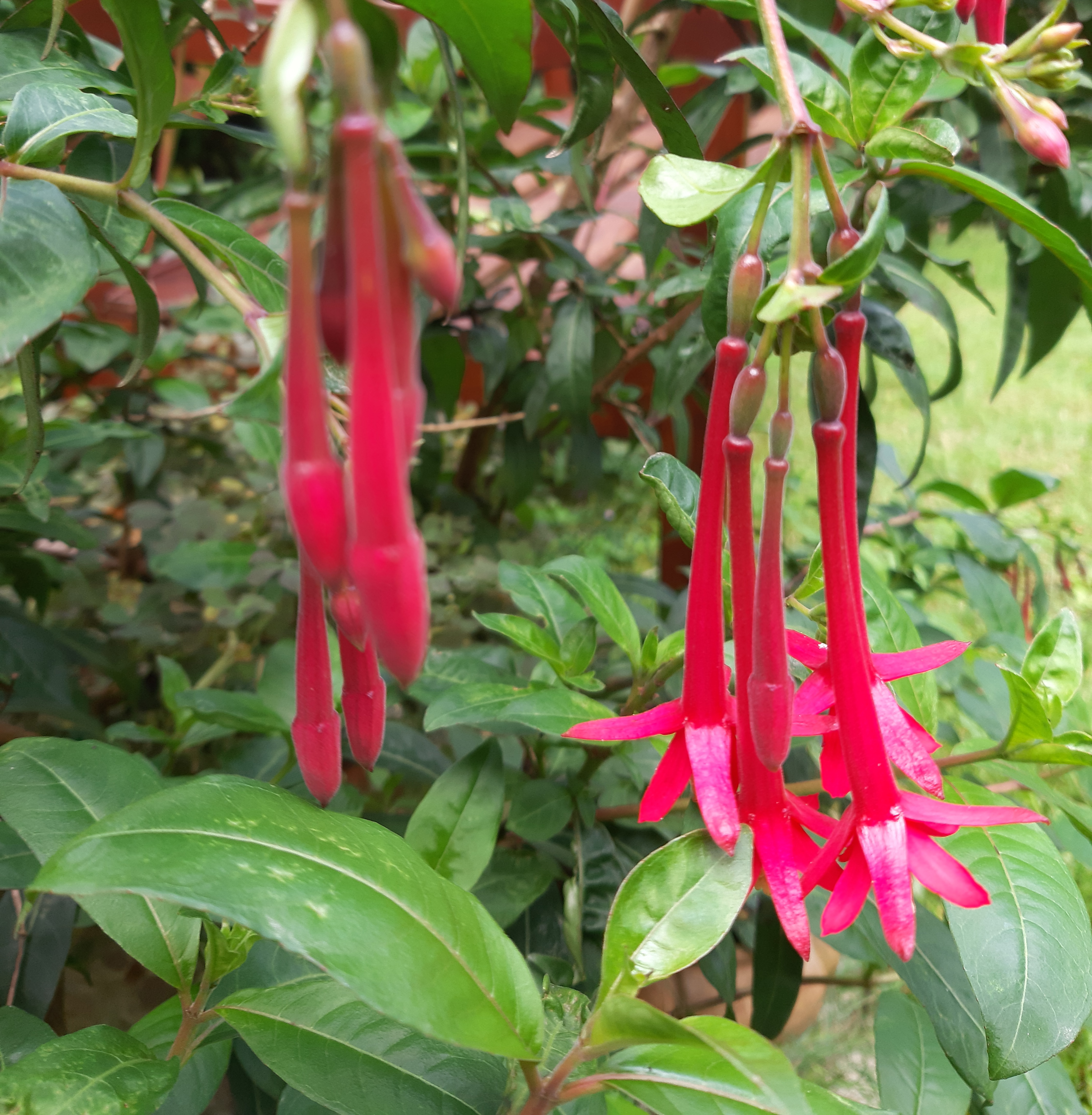

Scientific classification
- Kingdom: Plantae
- Clade: Tracheophytes
- Clade: Angiosperms
- Clade: Eudicots
- Clade: Rosids
- Order: Myrtales
- Family: Onagraceae
- Genus: Fuchsia
- Species: F. simplicicaulis

Binomial name
- Fuchsia simplicicaulis Ruiz & Pav.

= Fuchsia simplicicaulis =

Species of plant

Fuchsia simplicicaulis is a species of shrub in the family Onagraceae. It is endemic to Peru. Its Herbaria type is electrotype MA 11/92 11.

== Description ==
Fuchsia simplicicaulis is a scandent shrub growing 2-5 m tall, with branched stems. Young branches are subterete and hairy, with mature stems having red flaking bark. The leaves are lanceolate 8-15 x 1-3.5 cm wide. They are glabrous above and glabrous or pilose below along the veins. The petioles are 2-6 mm long. Stipules are triangular and 1-2 mm long. The pendant flowers bloom single to multiple on a 8-30 cm long rachis in racemes with 3-4 flowers. Bracts are ovate-lanceolate, and sharp at the apex. The ovary is 5-6 x 2-2.5 mm. The floral tube is funnel shaped 40-50 mm long. Sepals are lanceolate, puberulent 16-20 x 4 mm. Petals are red, linear-lanceolate 9-13 x 2-3(-5) mm. The filaments are 10-12 x 7-8 mm. The style is pilose from base of the flower to the edge of the tube.

The fruit is ellipsoid, puberulent, 11-13 x 8 mm. Seeds are tan, 1.2 x 0.7 mm wide.

== Distribution ==
Plants are found growing in the Peruvian cloud forest of Junin, Huanuco, and Pasco at elevations of 2200 - 2500 meters.
