= Cordillera Real (Ecuador) =

Chain of mountains in the Andes of Ecuador

Coordinates: 0°41′9″S 78°4′24″W

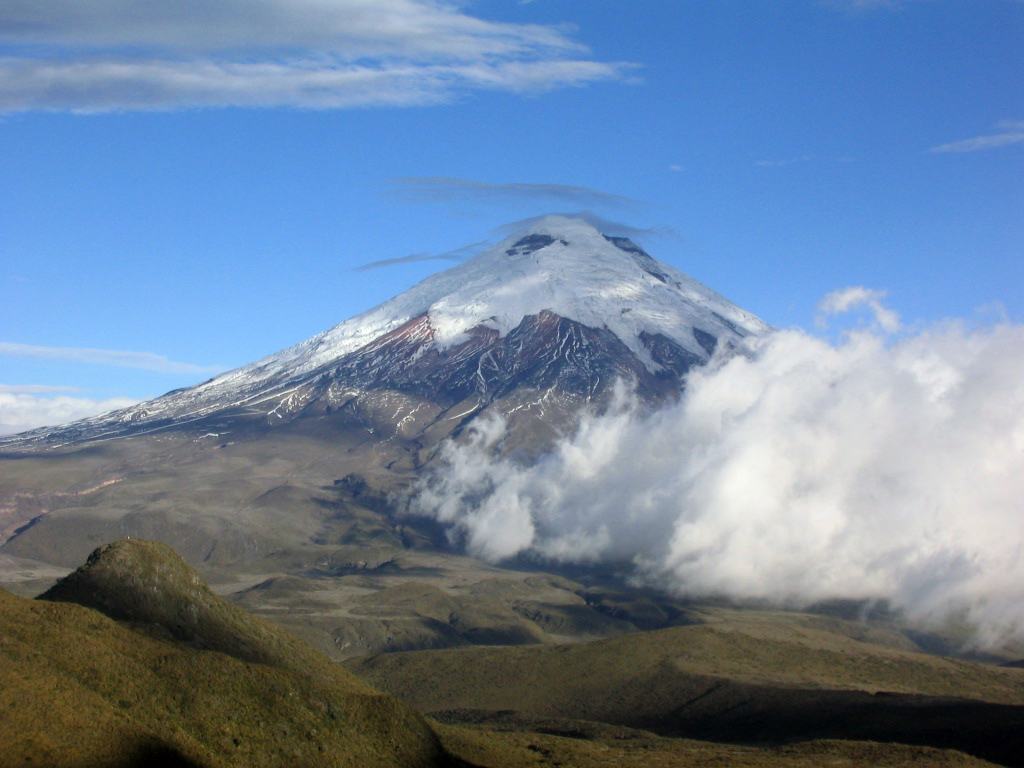
Cotopaxi, Ecuador

The Cordillera Real (also Cordillera of Quito, Cordillera Central of Ecuador) is a chain of mountains in the Andes of Ecuador, the largest of them volcanic. They are continued by the Cordillera Central of Peru to the south and the Cordillera Central of Colombia to the north. The Cordillera Real includes Antisana, Cotopaxi, and Cayambe, while Chimborazo is in the Cordillera Occidental.

The geology of the Cordillera Real includes metamorphic rock of sedimentary origin in addition to S-type granites dated to the early Mesozoic (>200 million years ago).

== See also ==
- Cordillera Occidental (Ecuador)
- Cordillera Central (disambiguation)
