= Paul Edward Berry =

American botanist (born 1952)

Paul Edward Berry (born 1952) is an American botanist and curator. He is Director of the Wisconsin State Herbarium.

Berry received his PhD. in Botany, from Washington University in St. Louis, in 1980, conducting biogeography studies.

Berry has worked in taxonomy of the genus Fuchsia (family Onagraceae), in 110 species of this ornamental genus, from Neotropic forests, and in New Zealand and Tahiti; studying the molecular taxonomy of Fuchsia and molecular temporal analysis. He published a popular text on Native Fuchsia Species, by Timber Press in 2004.

== Select publications ==
- Van Ee, B., P. E. Berry, R. Riina, and J. Gutiérrez-Amaro. 2008. Molecular phylogenetics and biogeography of the Caribbean-centered Croton subgenus Moacroton (Euphorbiaceae s.s.). Botanical Review 74: 132–165.
- Givnish, T. G., K. C. Millam, P. E. Berry, and K. J. Sytsma. 2007. Phylogeny, adaptive radiation, and historical biogeography of Bromeliaceae inferred from ndhF sequence data. Aliso 23: 3-26.
- Steinmann, V., B. Van Ee, P. E. Berry, and J. Gutiérrez. 2007. The systematic position ofCubanthus and other shrubby endemic species of Euphorbia (Euphorbiaceae) on Cuba. Anales del Jardín Botánico de Madrid 64: 123–133.
- Woodward, C. L., P. E. Berry, H. Maas-van de Kamer, and K. Swing. 2007. Tiputinia foetida, a new mycoheterotrophic genus of Thismiaceae from Amazonian Ecuador, and a likely case of deceit pollination. Taxon 56: 157–162.
- Van Ee, B. W., N. Jelinski, P. E. Berry, and A. L. Hipp. 2006. Phylogeny and biogeography of Croton alabamensis (Euphorbiaceae), a rare shrub from Texas and Alabama, using DNA sequence and AFLP data. Molecular Ecology 15: 2735–2751.
- Berry, P. E., I. Cordeiro, A. C. Wiedenhoeft, M. A. Vitorino-Cruz, and L. Ribes de Lima. 2005.Brasiliocroton, a new crotonoid genus of Euphorbiaceae s.s. from eastern Brazil. Systematic Botany 30: 356–364.
- Berry, P. E. A. L. Hipp, K. Wurdack, B. Van Ee, & R. Riina. 2005. Molecular phylogenetics of the giant genus Croton (Euphorbiaceae sensu stricto) using ITS and trnL–F DNA sequence data. American Journal of Botany 92: 1520–1534.
- Berry, P. E. & R. Riina. 2005. Insights into the diversity of the Pantepui flora and the biogeographic complexity of the Guayana Shield. Biologiske Skrifter 55: 145–167.
- Berry, P. E., W. J. Hahn, K. J. Sytsma, J. C. Hall, and A. Mast. 2004. Phylogenetic relationships and biogeography of Fuchsia (Onagraceae) based on non-coding nuclear and chloroplast DNA data. American Journal of Botany 91: 601–614.
- Givnish, T. G., K. C. Millam, T. M. Evans, J. C. Hall, J. C. Pires, P. E. Berry, & K. J. Sytsma. 2004. Ancient vicariance or recent long-distance dispersal? Inferences about phylogeny and South American-African disjunctions in Rapateaceae and Bromeliaceae based on ndhF sequence data. International Journal of Plant Sciences 165(4 Suppl.): S35–S54. 2004.
- Givnish, T.J., T.M. Evans, M.L. Zjhra, T.B. Patterson, P.E. Berry & K.J. Sytsma. [2000] 2001. Molecular evolution, adaptive radiation, and geographic diversification in the amphiatlantic family Rapateaceae: evidence from ndhF sequences and morphology. Evolution 54: 1915–1937.
- Berry, P. E. & R. N. Calvo. 1994. An overview of the reproductive biology of Espeletia (Asteraceae) in the Venezuelan Andes. Pp. 229–249 in: Rundel, P. W. & R. Meinzer (editors), Tropical Alpine Environments: Plant Form and Function. Cambridge University Press.
- Berry, P. E. & R. N. Calvo. 1991. Pollinator limitation and position-dependent fruit set in the high Andean orchid Myrosmodes cochleare Garay. Plant Systematics and Evolution 174: 93–101.
- Berry, P. E., H. Tobe, & J. A. Gómez. 1991. Agamospermy and the loss of distyly in Erythroxylum undulatum Plowman (Erythroxylaceae) from northern Venezuela. American Journal of Botany 78: 595–600.
- Berry, P. E. 1989. A systematic revision of Fuchsia sect. Quelusia (Onagraceae). Annals of the Missouri Botanical Garden 76: 532–584.
- Berry, P. E. & R. N. Calvo. 1989. Wind pollination, self-incompatibility and altitudinal shifts in pollination systems in the high Andean genus Espeletia (Asteraceae). American Journal of Botany 75: 1602–1614.
- Berry, P. E. 1985. The systematics of the apetalous fuchsias of South America, Fuchsia sect. Hemsleyella (Onagraceae). Annals of the Missouri Botanical Garden 72: 213–251.
- Berry, P. E. 1982. The systematics and evolution of Fuchsia sect. Fuchsia (Onagraceae). Annals of the Missouri Botanical Garden 69: 1–198.

== Books and Floras ==
- Hokche, O., P. E. Berry, and O. Huber (editors). 2008. Nuevo Catálogo de las Plantas Vasculares de Venezuela. Herbario Nacional de Venezuela, Caracas.
- Funk, V., T. Hollowell, P. E. Berry, C. Kelloff, and S. N. Alexander. 2007. Checklist of the plants of the Guiana Shield (Venezuela: Amazonas, Bolívar, Delta Amacuro; Guyana, Surinam, French Guiana). Contributions from the United States National Herbarium 55: 1–584.
- Berry, P. E., K. Yatskievych & B. K. Holst (editors). 2005. Flora of the Venezuelan Guayana.Volumes 9. Rutaceae to Zygophyllaceae. 608 pp., 503 figs. Missouri Botanical Garden Press, St. Louis.
- Berry, P. E., K. Yatskievych & B. K. Holst (editors). 2004. Flora of the Venezuelan Guayana. Volume 8. Poaceae to Rubiaceae. 888 pp., 659 figs. Missouri Botanical Garden Press, St. Louis.
- Berry, P. E., K. Yatskievych & B. K. Holst (editors). 2003. Flora of the Venezuelan Guayana. Volume 7. Spermatophytes: Myrtaceae to Plumbaginaceae. 765 pp, 646 figs. Missouri Botanical Garden Press, St. Louis.
- Berry, P. E., K. Yatskievych & B. K. Holst (editors). 2001. Flora of the Venezuelan Guayana. Volume 6. Spermatophytes: Liliaceae to Myrsinaceae. 803 pp, 640 figs. Missouri Botanical Garden Press, St. Louis.
- Berry, P. E., K. Yatskievych & B.K. Holst (editors). 1999. Flora of the Venezuelan Guayana. Volume 5. Spermatophytes: Eriocaulaceae to Lentibulariaceae. 833 pp, 708 figs. Missouri Botanical Garden Press, St. Louis.
- Berry, P. E., B. K. Holst, & K. Yatskievych (editors). 1998. Flora of the Venezuelan Guayana.Volume 4. Spermatophytes: Caesalpiniaceae to Ericaceae. Missouri Botanical Garden Press, St. Louis. 799 pp.
- Berry, P. E., B. K. Holst, & K. Yatskievych (editors). 1997. Flora of the Venezuelan Guayana.Volume 3. Spermatophytes: Araliaceae to Cactaceae. Missouri Botanical Garden, St. Louis. 774 pp.
- Berry, P. E., B. K. Holst, & K. Yatskievych (editors). 1995. Flora of the Venezuelan Guayana.Volume 2. Pteridophytes, Spermatophytes: Acanthaceae to Asclepiadaceae. Timber Press, Portland, Oregon.
- Berry, P. E., B. K. Holst, & K. Yatskievych (editors). 1995. Flora of the Venezuelan Guayana.Volume I. Introductory chapters, key to the families of seed plants, vegetation and topographical maps. Timber Press, Portland, Oregon.
- Wetter, M.A., T.S. Cochrane, M.R. Black, H.H. Iltis, & P.E. Berry. 2001. Checklist of the Vascular Plants of Wisconsin. 258 pp. Technical Bulletin Series # 192, Wisconsin Department of Natural Resources.
