= Prevalence of rabies =

Epidemiological topic

Reported rabies deaths

The prevalence of rabies, a deadly viral disease affecting mammals, varies significantly across regions worldwide, posing a persistent public health problem. Rabies is caused by lyssaviruses, including the rabies virus, the Australian bat lyssavirus, the European bat 1 lyssavirus and the European bat 2 lyssavirus.

At a global level dog bites and scratches cause 99% of the human rabies cases, but in some countries, including the United States, most cases of human rabies are acquired from bats.

Almost all cases of human rabies are transmitted by animal bites or scratches, or other contact of animal saliva with the eyes, mouth, or open wounds. Although human-to-human transmission is theoretically possible, given that the rabies virus is present in the saliva, sperm and vaginal secretions of infected people and therefore could be transmitted through bites or sexual intercourse, no such case of transmission has ever been documented. There have been, however, rare cases of transmission of rabies through organ transplants, as well as vertically transmitted infection. (to prevent vertically transmitted infection, it is recommended that pregnant and breastfeeding women potentially exposed to rabies undergo post-exposure prophylaxis). No case of rabies transmission from consuming the meat or milk of rabid animals has ever been documented, although the World Health Organization strongly discourages eating products from rabid animals.

Almost all human deaths caused by rabies occur in Asia and Africa. It is estimated that 60% of rabies human deaths occur in Africa. Human rabies is common in many African cities, due to factors such as large numbers of stray dogs, which can lead to reoccurring endemic outbreaks of rabies, such as the 2009 rabies outbreak in Luanda, which resulted in 93 children confirmed dead from rabies during a three months period, with the total number believed to be much higher. Outside of Africa, rabies is especially prevalent in India (which accounts for 36% of global rabies deaths) and in parts of Southeast Asia. Rabies is rare in Europe, although sporadic cases do occur in Eastern Europe, particularly in red foxes. In the Americas, bats are the primary vectors of the disease, although canine rabies is still endemic in some parts of the Americas, notably in the context of rabies in Haiti.

In the Western world, human cases of rabies are extremely rare, and dog licensing, euthanasia of stray dogs, muzzling, and other measures contributed to the elimination of terrestrial rabies from some regions, such as the United Kingdom in the early 20th century. More recently, large-scale vaccination of cats, dogs and ferrets has been successful in combating rabies in many developed countries, such as Turkey, where pre-exposure vaccinations have been used to combat the prevalence of rabies.

Oral vaccines can be safely administered to wild animals through bait, a method first used in Switzerland in the 1970s, which has successfully reduced rabies in many parts of Europe and North America. The European Union has sponsored oral vaccination campaigns for wildlife in the EU member states, as well as in some regions outside the EU, such as in the Western Balkans.

According to the World Health Organization, there are an estimated 59,000 human rabies deaths annually occurring in over 150 countries, with 95% of these cases being in Africa and Asia. In addition, over 29 million people globally receive the rabies vaccine annually. Along with the vaccine, some people also receive rabies immunoglobulin (RIG) in the form of HRIG (Human Rabies Immunoglobulin) or ERIG (Equine Rabies Immunoglobulin), and, as an alternative to RIG, anti-rabies monoclonal antibodies are used in some places, having been approved for use in China and in India since 2016.

== Dogs ==
Dog-mediated rabies is defined as "any case caused by rabies virus maintained in the dog population (Canis lupus familiaris) independently of other animal reservoir species, as determined by epidemiological studies". Most Western countries have eliminated dog-mediated rabies but it remains prevalent in developing countries.

Dog-mediated rabies represents a threat to human health, particularly in Asia and Africa, especially in areas where there are numerous stray dogs. In India rabies is primarily transmitted to humans from dogs (97% of human rabies cases), followed by cats (2%), jackals, mongooses and others (1%). In places where human consumption of dog meat is common, such as Vietnam, butchers who slaughter dogs are at risk of contracting rabies.

In Western countries illegal smuggling of dogs from other countries, or travelling with unvaccinated dogs abroad to countries where rabies is prevalent, can reintroduce rabies in the rabies-free Western countries. For instance in Spain in 2013 a rabid dog, which had been infected in Morocco, was discovered in Toledo.

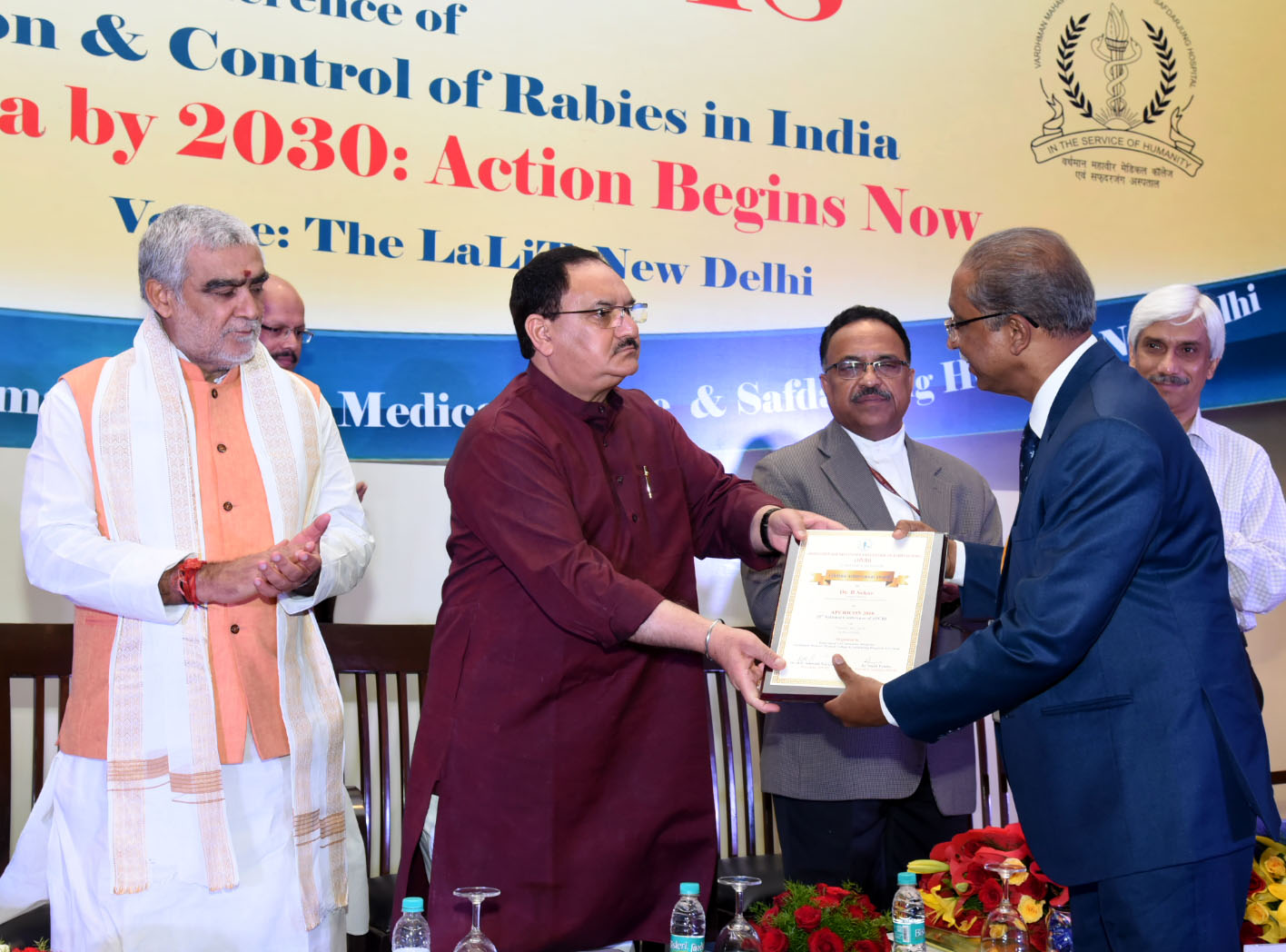
Rabies prevention efforts in India, which accounts for 36% of the world's rabies deaths

A dog is given a rabies vaccine in the Philippines

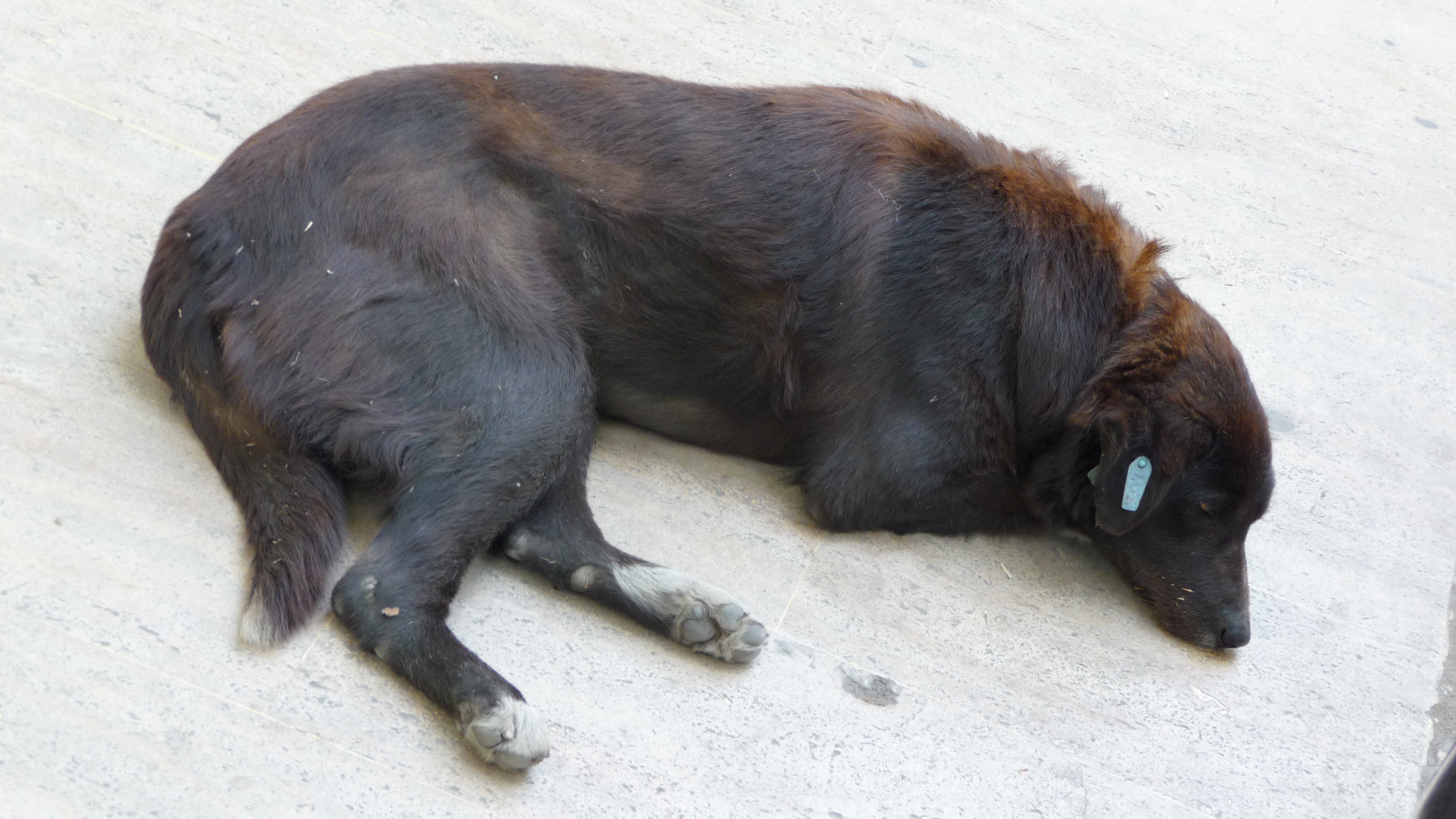
A stray dog with an ear tag, indicating that it has been part of a trap–neuter–return program, a policy enacted in many countries in order to prevent the spread of rabies

A dog with rabies

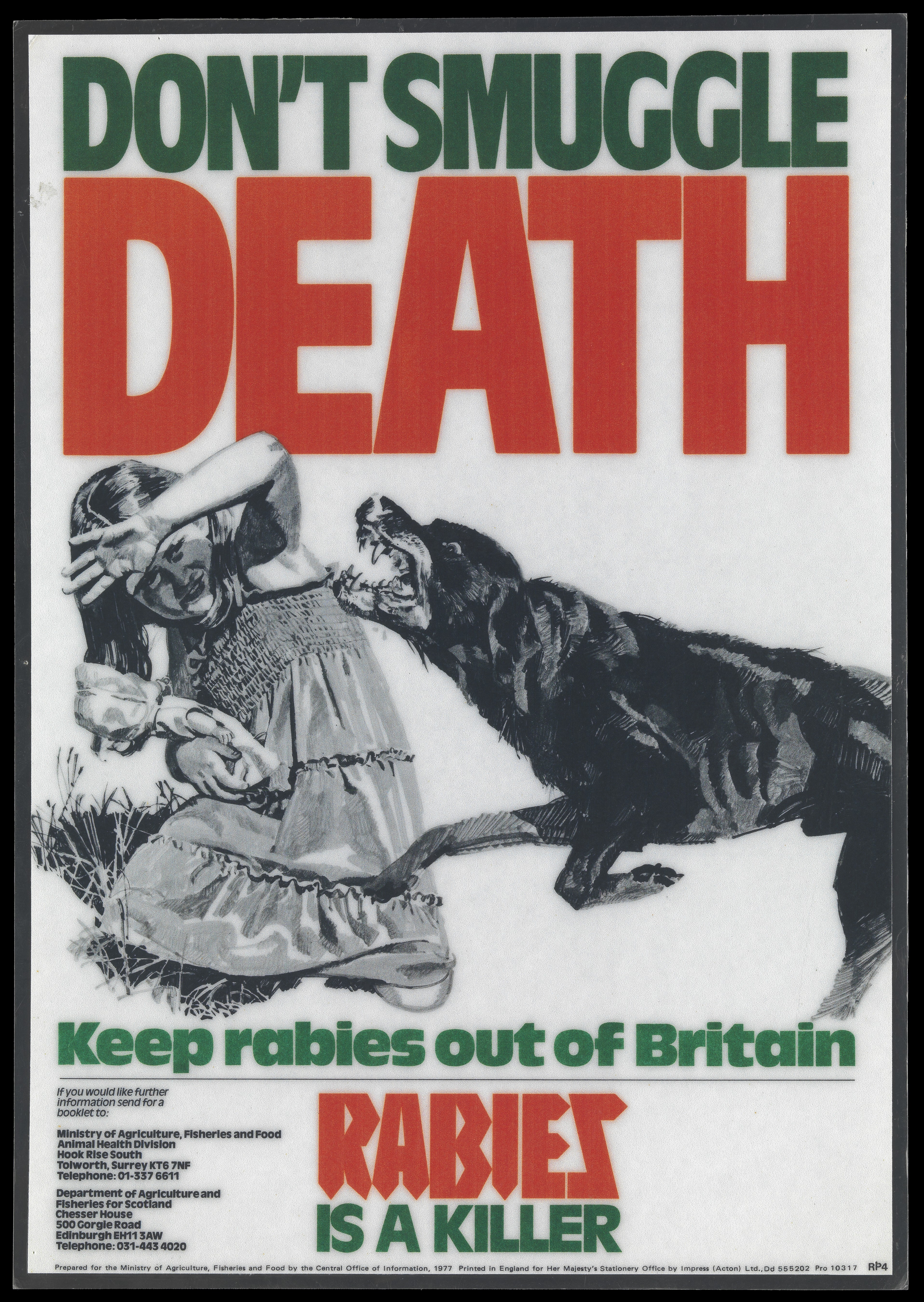
A 1977 British poster warning about the risks of illegal import of dogs

== Bats ==
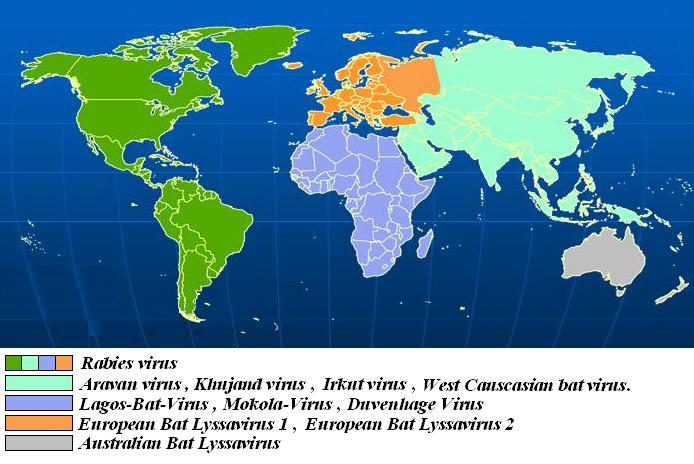
Geographical distribution of lyssaviruses carried by bats

Bats in most parts of the world carry lyssaviruses. In the Americas, bats carry the classical rabies virus (RABV), with vampire bats being the principal vector of human transmission of rabies in Latin America. In the United States, the silver haired bat and the tricolored bat are responsible for about 60% of human rabies infections in cases where the virus variant was identified.

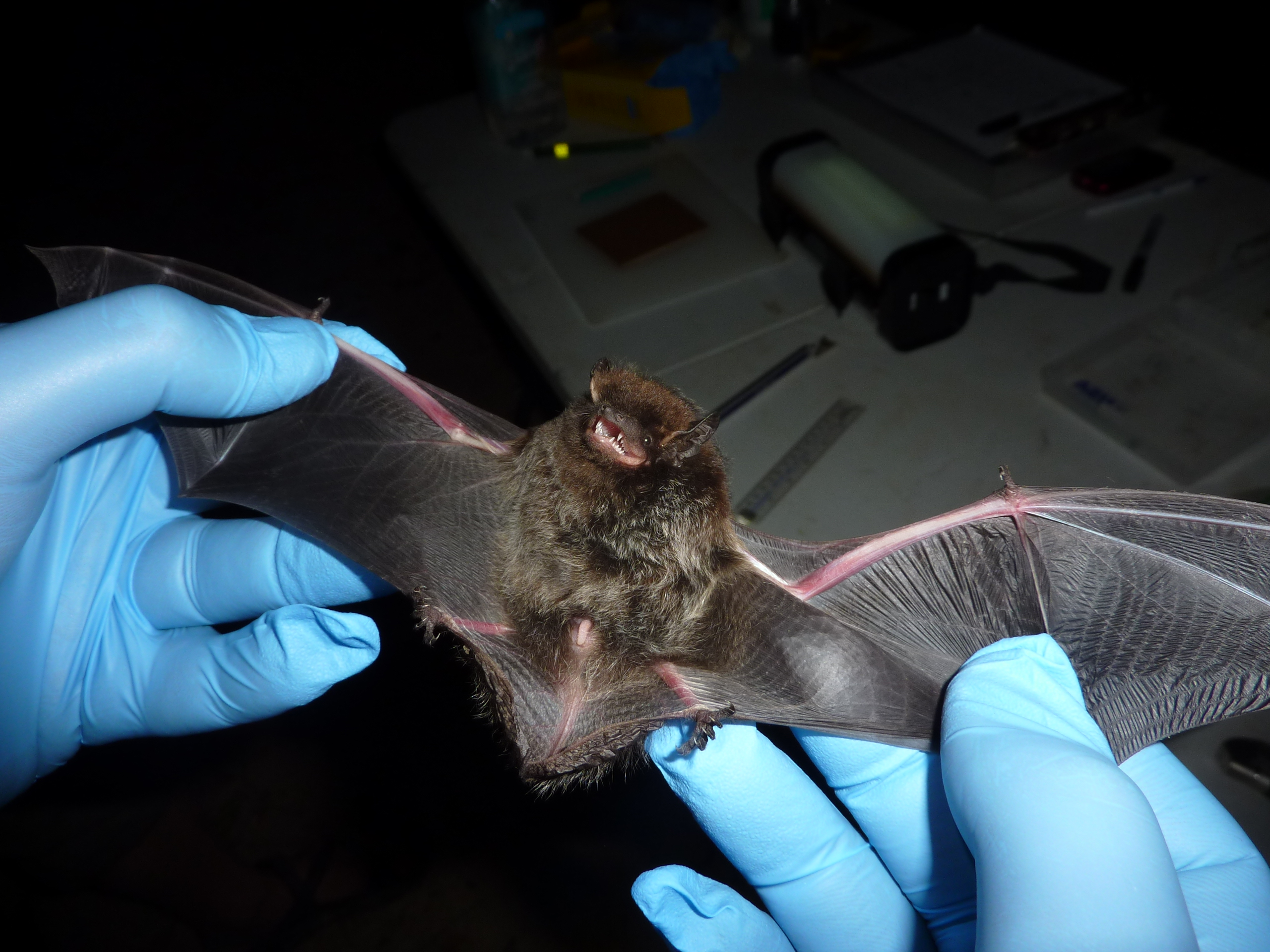
The silver haired bat (pictured) and the tricolored bat are responsible for about 60% of human rabies infections in the United States, in cases where the virus variant was identified.

The most common lyssaviruses carried by bats in Europe are European bat 1 lyssavirus and European bat 2 lyssavirus, although Bokeloh bat lyssavirus (BBLV), West Caucasian bat lyssavirus (WCBV), Lleida bat lyssavirus (LLEBV) and Kotalahti bat lyssavirus have also been discovered.

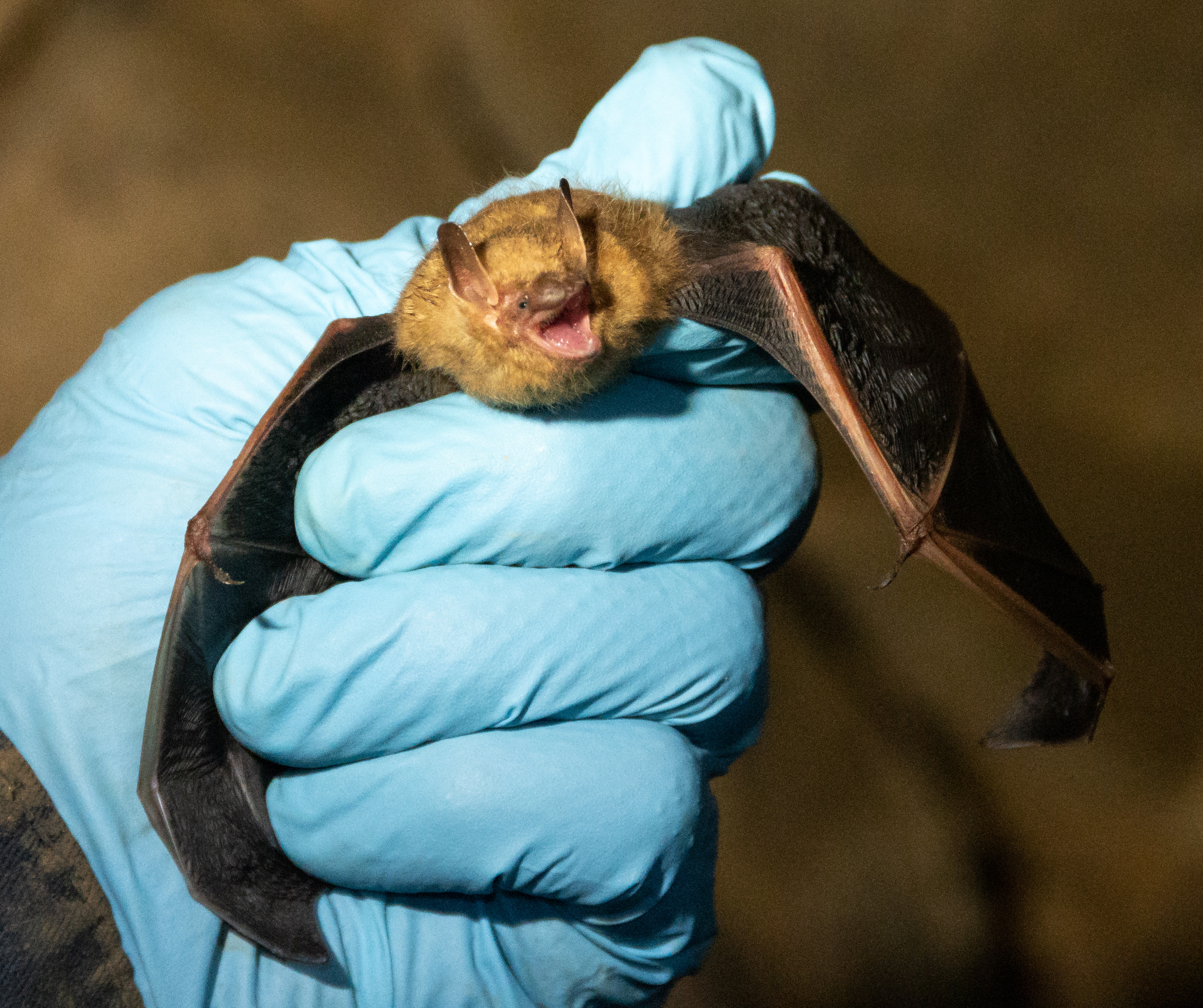
A tricolored bat

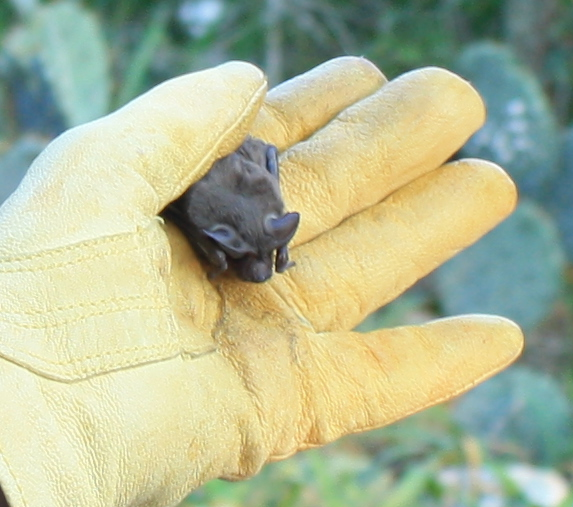
A Mexican free-tailed bat, which is a non-hematophagous rabies reservoir in the Americas. In Latin America, the principal rabies reservoir among bats are vampire bats, which are a hematophagous species which can transmit rabies to humans and other animals, especially livestock.

In Australia, bats carry Australian bat lyssavirus, which has caused four human deaths since its discovery in 1996, the most recent one being in 2025 in New South Wales.

In Asia, bats carry Aravan lyssavirus, Khujand lyssavirus, Irkut lyssavirus, West Caucasian bat lyssavirus and Gannoruwa bat lyssavirus.

In Africa, bats carry Lagos bat virus, Mokola virus, Duvenhage virus, Ikoma lyssavirus and Shimoni bat lyssavirus. In 2007, a Dutch woman died in Amsterdam, after she had contracted the Duvenhage virus from a bat while on a trip in Kenya.

It is understood that the rabies vaccine used to prevent infection with the classical rabies virus (RABV) also offers protection against lyssaviruses in Pylogroup I category (Australian bat lyssavirus (ABLV), Aravan virus (ARAV), Bokeloh bat lyssavirus (BBLV), Duvenhage virus (DUVV), European bat lyssavirus type 1 (EBLV-1), European bat lyssavirus type 2 (EBLV-2), Gannoruwa bat lyssavirus (GBLV), Irkut virus (IRKV), and Khujand virus (KHUV)), but does not offer protection against the more divergent lyssaviruses in Phylogroup II category (Lagos bat virus (LBV Lineages A–D), Mokola virus (MOKV), and Shimoni bat virus (SHIBV)) and the highly divergent lyssaviruses of Phylogroup III category (Ikoma lyssavirus (IKOV), Lleida bat lyssavirus (LLEBV), and West Caucasian bat virus (WCBV)).

Only 14 human deaths from lyssaviruses other than RABV have been reported as of 2021, although this is likely an underestimation of the total number, given the complexity of diagnosis and of distinguishing between different lyssavirus species. In Europe, there have been five such deaths documented: in Ukraine (1977, species not characterised), Russia (1985, EBLV‐1), Finland (1985, EBLV‐2), the United Kingdom (2002, EBLV‐2) and France (2019, EBLV‐1).

It is possible, albeit extremely rare, for lyssaviruses other than RABV to spillover from bats to terrestrial mammals. Such cases have occurred in Denmark in 1998 and 2002 (in sheep), in Germany in 2001 (in a stone marten), in France in 2003 and 2007 (in cats), in 2020 in Italy (in a cat), and in 2024 in the Netherlands (in a cat).

== Asia ==
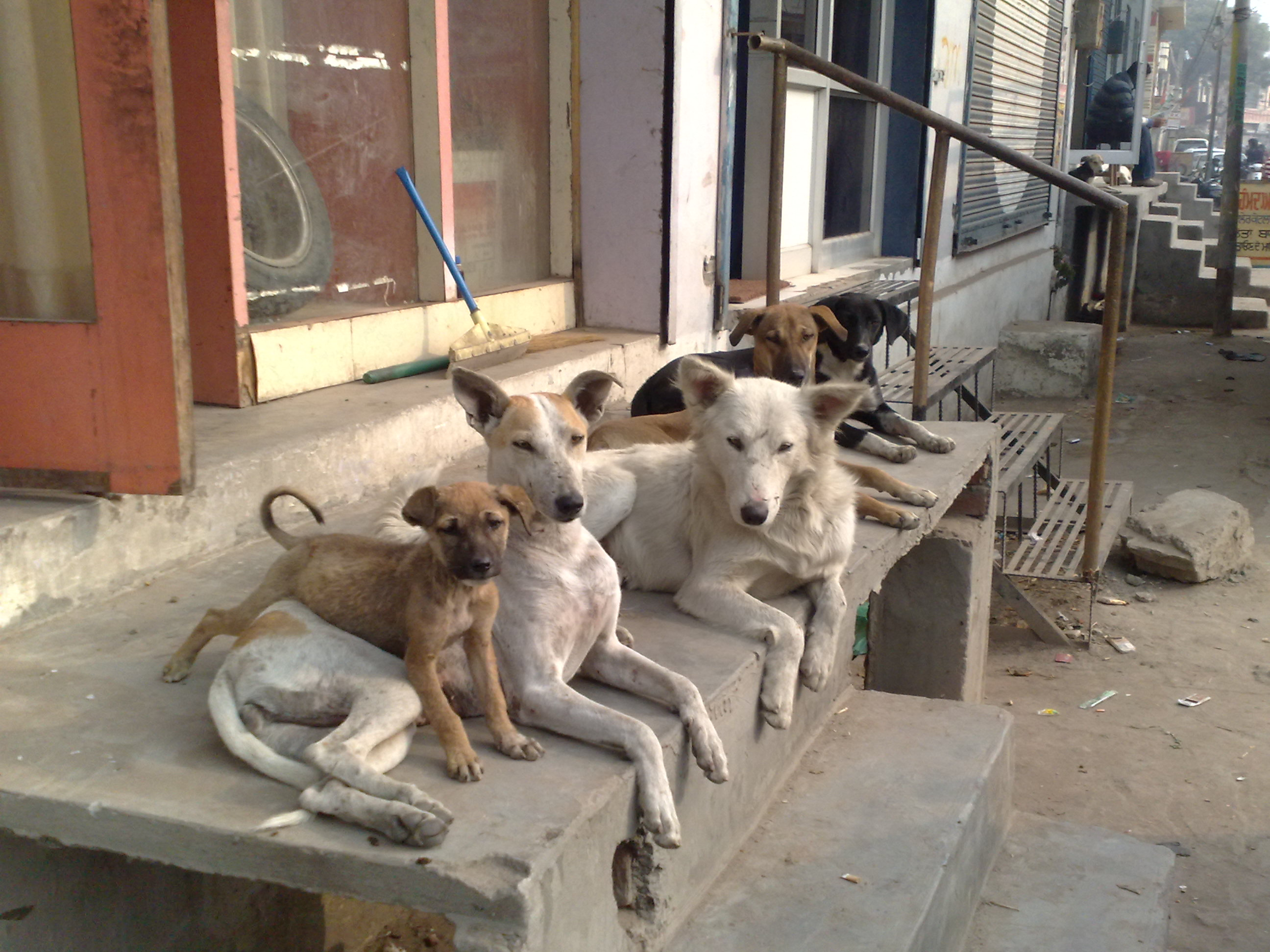
Managing stray dogs, by vaccination or removal from the streets, is necessary in order to prevent rabies. It is estimated that there are about 62 million stray dogs in India.

An estimated 31,000 human deaths due to rabies occur annually in Asia, with the majority – approximately 20,000 – concentrated in India. Worldwide, India has the highest rate of human rabies in the world primarily due to stray dogs. Because of a decline in the number of vultures due to acute poisoning by the anti-inflammatory drug diclofenac (vultures themselves are not susceptible to rabies), animal carcasses that would have been consumed by vultures instead became available for consumption by feral dogs, resulting in a growth of the dog population and thus a larger pool of carriers for the rabies virus. Another reason for the great increase in the number of stray dogs is the 2001 law that forbade the killing of dogs.

In many Asian countries which still have a high prevalence of rabies, such as Myanmar and Nepal, the virus is primarily transmitted through canines (feral dogs and other wild canine species). Countries with high canine rabies prevalence often lack robust national rabies surveillance/control programs and have limited canine rabies vaccine availability. Legalized dog consumption, in countries such as Vietnam, is another source of high rabies incidence in Southeast Asia. One study reported that 28.3% of dog butchers in Vietnam were at high risk of rabies infection, but only 8.1% were vaccinated. Another source of rabies in Asia is the pet boom.

=== Mainland China ===
Historically rabies was highly endemic in China, with few/inconsistent attempts to control transmission due to the lack of healthcare infrastructure. More than 5,200 deaths were reported annually during the period 1987–1989. Infection is seasonal, with most cases reported during the winter and spring, with dogs being the most common animal vector. The highest number of recorded cases was recorded in 1981, with 7,037 human infections. Death rates did not decrease until the 1990s, as eradication efforts started being implemented on a nationwide level. The incidence of rabies decreased to fewer than 2,000 cases per annum by 2011. Despite this progress, rabies is still the fourth most common cause of death amongst category A and B infectious diseases, following HIV/AIDS, tuberculosis, and viral hepatitis in 2018.

Chinese law requires all diagnosed rabies cases to be recorded in the National Notifiable Disease Reporting System (NNDRS) within 24 hours of diagnosis. Additionally, a questionnaire is used to interview patients and family members, in order to collect demographic information, as well as the means of exposure.

Due to China's open organ transplant policy, an additional vector for the transmission of rabies is via donated organs. There have been 4 reported cases of rabies transmission through organ donation in China. The first occurred in 2015, where a previously healthy 2-year-old patient was checked in to a hospital with unspecified symptoms. Rabies virus antibody tests were performed on serum samples and yielded negative results, which allowed the body to be used for donations despite suspicions from the clinical staff. The donor's kidneys and liver were transplanted to three other patients, who eventually died due to the rabies virus.

In 2006 China introduced the "one-dog policy" in Beijing to control the problem. In 2021, the Law on Animal Epidemic Prevention was revised, and now requires dog owners to ensure routine vaccination and register the vaccine certificate.

Number of human rabies cases in mainland China
Year	2004	2005	2006	2007	2008	2009	2010	2011	2012	2013	2014	2015	2016	2017	2018	2019	2020	2021	2022	2023
Cases	2651	2537	3279	3300	2466	2213	2048	1917	1425	1172	924	801	644	516	422	290	202	157	133	122

=== Indonesia ===
The island of Bali in Indonesia has been undergoing a severe outbreak of canine rabies since 2008, that has also killed about 78 humans as of late September 2010. Unlike predominantly Muslim parts of Indonesia, in Bali many dogs are kept as pets and strays are tolerated in residential areas. Efforts are under way to vaccinate pets and strays, as well as selective culling of some strays, to control the outbreak. As Bali is a popular tourist destination, visitors are advised to consider rabies vaccinations before going there, if they will be touching animals.

=== Israel ===
Since 1948, 31 people have been reported dead from rabies in Israel. 55 rabies incidents were reported in 2024, and 45 rabies incidents were reported in 2023. The latest case of human rabies was in 2024, when a man became infected after being bitten by his pet dog. In 2023, a child died after being bitten by a rabid stray dog in the Jordan Valley. Prior to that, the last death was in 2003, when a 58-year-old Bedouin woman was bitten by a cat and became infected. She was not inoculated and later died.

Rabies is endemic to Israel. The areas of highest prevalence are along the northern region, which are close to Lebanon and Syria. Since the early 2000s, The Ministry of Agriculture and Israel Nature and National Parks Protection Authority (ILA) have dropped oral vaccines from planes in open and agricultural areas. The vaccine comes in the form of 3 by 3 cm. dumplings, made with an ingredient preferred by wild animals, and which contain a transgenic rabies virus. Cases of animal rabies dropped from 58 in 2009 to 29 in 2016.

=== Japan ===
Rabies existed in Japan with a spike in the mid-1920s, but a dog vaccination campaign and increased control of stray dogs reduced the number of human cases. The Rabies Control Act was enacted in 1950, and Japan is believed to have been rabies-free since 1957. There have been four imported cases since then: a college student who died in 1970, two elderly men who had traveled to the Philippines and been bitten there by rabid dogs, and then died after returning to Japan, and a man in his 30s who also was bitten by a rabid dog in the Philippines and died in 2020.

== Africa ==
Approximately 24,000 people die from rabies annually in Africa, which accounts for almost half the total rabies deaths worldwide each year. Africa is the second leading continent in prevalence of rabies, with the first being Asia. It is theorized that rabies was spread to Africa through colonization from Europe, and from there spread from central Africa to the rest of the continent over time. The canine population in Africa is a contributor of the high number of rabies infections, compared to other continents. The treatments used for the prevention of rabies, (post-exposure prophylaxis, and pre-exposure prophylaxis) can be high in price, and this may be another contributing factor to the high percentage of rabies infections from in Africa, and similar countries that do not have the vaccines and treatments readily available. The cost of the vaccination and the large population of dogs, who can easily spread the virus, means that Africa has a higher risk of rabies than countries who have had mass vaccinations.

=== North Africa ===
Rabies is present in North Africa. In the period of 2007–2008, 90% of human rabies cases in this region were acquired from dogs. In Algeria, Morocco and Tunisia, between 2005 and 2013, there were 389 confirmed cases of human rabies. This region is a popular tourist area, and there have been several cases of rabies contracted by Western tourists who traveled to these countries in recent years; such cases include the contracting of the virus from Morocco by tourists from Spain in 2014 and 2019, from France in 2023 and 2025 and from the United Kingdom in 2018 and 2025.

=== South Africa ===
In South Africa, about a dozen cases of human rabies are confirmed every year and it is particularly widespread in the north-eastern regions of the Eastern Cape, the eastern and south-eastern areas of Mpumalanga, northern Limpopo and KwaZulu-Natal. Dogs are the main vector (especially in the east of the country) for the disease but also wildlife, including the bat-eared fox, yellow mongoose and black-backed jackal. The death rate of 13 per annum over the decade 2001–2010 is a rate of approximately 0.26 per million population. This is approximately 30 times the rate in the United States but 1/90 of the African average. The number of cases per province over the last decade is as follows:

Year	Eastern Cape	Free State	Gauteng	KwaZulu-Natal	Limpopo	Mpumalanga	Northern Cape	North-West	Western Cape	South Africa
2001				6		1				7
2002				8			1		1	10
2003	1			9				1		11
2004				7		1				8
2005	3	1		3						7
2006	4			4	22			1		31
2007	6			8	1					15
2008	8			5	3	1				17
2009	7			4	2	2				15
2010	2		1	3	3	1	1		1	12
2001 to 2010	31	1	1	57	31	6	2	2	2	133
2011	1			2	3					6
2012	1	1		4	3	1				10
2013		2		1	3	1				7
2014	3				1			1		5
2015	3	1		1	3					8
Average	2.6	0.3	0.1	5.4	2.9	0.5	0.1	0.2	0.1	11.3

== North America ==
=== United States ===
The United States, as with other developed countries, has seen a dramatic decrease in the number of human infections and deaths due to the rabies virus. According to the Centers for Disease Control and Prevention (CDC), the stark reduction in the number of rabies cases is attributable to the elimination of canine rabies through vaccination, the vaccination of wildlife, education about the virus, and timely administration of post-exposure prophylaxis. Currently, in the U.S., only one to three cases of rabies in humans are reported annually. In 2019 and 2020 there were no reported cases of human rabies, in 2021 there were a record of five rabies human deaths, the highest number in a decade, possibly because of a lack of awareness about the risks of rabies. In 2022, there was no human death due to rabies. In November 2024, a California art teacher died from rabies, about a month after being bitten by a bat she found in her classroom. In 2024, there was also a rabies human death in Minnesota (contracted from a bat), and a rabies human death in Kentucky (believed to have been acquired abroad). In 2025, a Michigan resident died of rabies after receiving a kidney transplant in Ohio.

Human exposure to the virus is dependent on the prevalence of the virus in animals, thus investigations into the incidence and distribution of animal populations is vital. A breakdown of the results obtained from animal surveillance in the U.S. for 2015 revealed that wild animals accounted for 92.4% and domestic animals accounted for 7.6% of all reported cases. In wild animals, bats were the most frequently reported rabid species (30.9% of cases during 2015), followed by raccoons (29.4%), skunks (24.8%), and foxes (5.9%).

==== Southern ====
Rabies was once rare in the United States outside the Southern states, but raccoons in the mid-Atlantic and northeast United States have had a rabies epidemic since the 1970s, that is now moving westwards into Ohio. Most westward expansion has been prevented via the action of Oral Rabies Vaccination (ORV) programs.

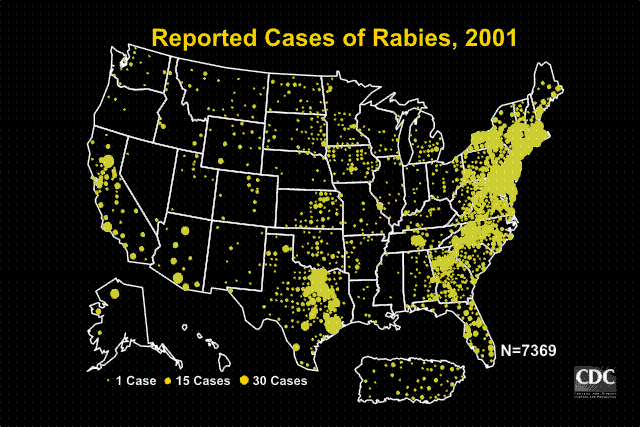
Cases of animal rabies in the United States in 2001

The particular variant of the virus has been identified in the southeastern United States raccoon population since the 1950s, and is believed to have traveled to the northeast as the result of infected raccoons being among those caught and transported from the southeast to the northeast by human hunters attempting to replenish the declining northeast raccoon population. As a result, urban residents of these areas have become more wary of the large but normally unseen urban raccoon population. Whether as a result of increased vigilance or only the common human avoidance reaction to any other animal not normally seen, such as a raccoon, there has only been one documented human rabies case as a result of this variant. This does not include, however, the greatly increasing rate of prophylactic rabies treatments in cases of possible exposure, which numbered fewer than one hundred humans annually in the state of New York before 1990, for instance, but rose to approximately ten thousand annually between 1990 and 1995. At approximately $1,500 per course of treatment, this represents a considerable public health expenditure. Raccoons do constitute approximately 50% of the approximately eight thousand documented non-human rabies cases in the United States.

==== Midwestern ====
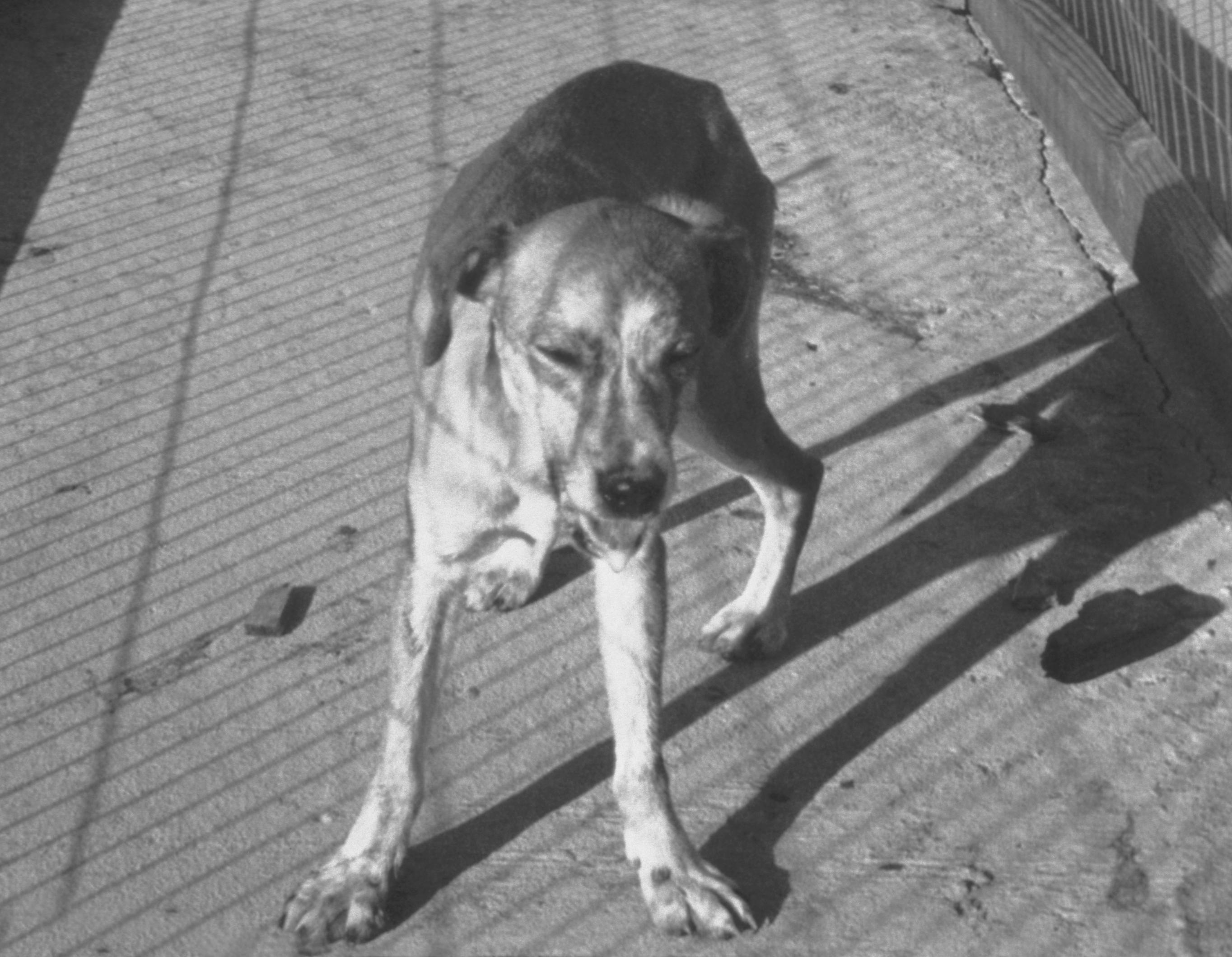
A rabid dog, with saliva dripping out of the mouth

In the midwestern United States, skunks are the primary carriers of rabies. The most widely distributed reservoir of rabies in the United States, however, and the source of most human cases in the U.S., are bats. All five of the human rabies cases in the Midwest from 2009 to 2018 were identified genetically as strains of rabies from bats.

On 7 September 2007, rabies expert Dr. Charles Rupprecht of Atlanta-based U.S. Centers for Disease Control and Prevention said that canine rabies had disappeared from the United States. Rupprecht emphasized that the disappearance of the canine-specific strain of rabies virus in the US does not eliminate the need for dog rabies vaccination as dogs can still become infected from exposure to wildlife.

==== Southwestern ====
The primary terrestrial reservoirs for the Southwest states are skunks and foxes, with bats being identified as another important species for virus persistence in the environment. In Colorado the growing population pressures indicated by the increase in the number of residents by 9.2% between 2010 and 2016 has led to an elevated risk of rabies to the public. Additionally, according to Colorado Parks and Wildlife, reported cases, as well as the geographical distribution, in skunks, raccoons, and bats have increased; thereby further enhancing the likelihood of exposure. Together these increased risk factors have been documented in the state by the Colorado Department of Public Health and Environment, which reported 141 positive animals; 95 of these reported animal cases were suspected to have exposed 180 domestic pets, 193 livestock animals, and 59 people. In New Mexico the same trend of increased prevalence in wildlife has been observed with a reported 57% increase in the number of rabid bats. As of 2017, there have been 11 confirmed cases of rabies in New Mexico: 5 bats, 2 skunks, 2 bobcats, and 2 foxes. Conversely to these two states, Arizona in 2015 saw a drop in the number of confirmed rabies cases with a 21.3% decrease in reported skunk and fox rabies virus variants. Furthermore, during that same time frame in Arizona 53.3% of all reported positive rabies cases were bats and 40% were identified as skunks. Similarly, in 2015, Utah reported 22 positive cases of rabid bats. For the year of 2016 Utah identified 20 cases of rabies, all in bat species.

=== Canada ===
Rabies is present in Canadian wildlife, although human rabies cases have been extremely rare in Canada in recent history. Dog mediated rabies has never been fully established in Canada, although it was repeatedly introduced in the country from abroad in the late 19th century and early 20th century. Since 1924, only 28 people have died of rabies; however, rabies is endemic in Canadian wildlife. As of 2025, there have been only five cases of rabies contracted domestically in Canada since 2000, and another case contracted outside Canada. All cases contracted in Canada were from exposure to the virus through a bat. The Canadian cases happened in 2000 in Quebec, in 2003 and 2019 in British Columbia, in 2007 in Alberta and in 2024 in Ontario. The province of Ontario continues aerial drops of baits containing rabies vaccines, which reduced the incidence of rabies by 99% since the 1990s, but continues to fight a 2015 outbreak of rabies in wild raccoons imported from the U.S. In 2024, a child in Ontario died from rabies after contracting the virus from a bat, which was the first case of human rabies domestically contracted in Ontario since 1967.

== South America ==
In some parts of South America, rabies is contracted by humans most often from vampire bats. Vampire bats usually feed on the blood of wildlife or livestock, but sometimes they use humans too, especially in areas where the Amazon rainforest habitat of the bats has been destroyed. Vampire bats' attacks on humans have occurred in various parts of Latin America, such as the Amazon region of Peru, and the Ecuadorian Amazon. In Brazil, human rabies outbreaks mediated by bats are most common in the Amazon region and in the Northeast, although they occur in other parts of the country too.

== Europe ==
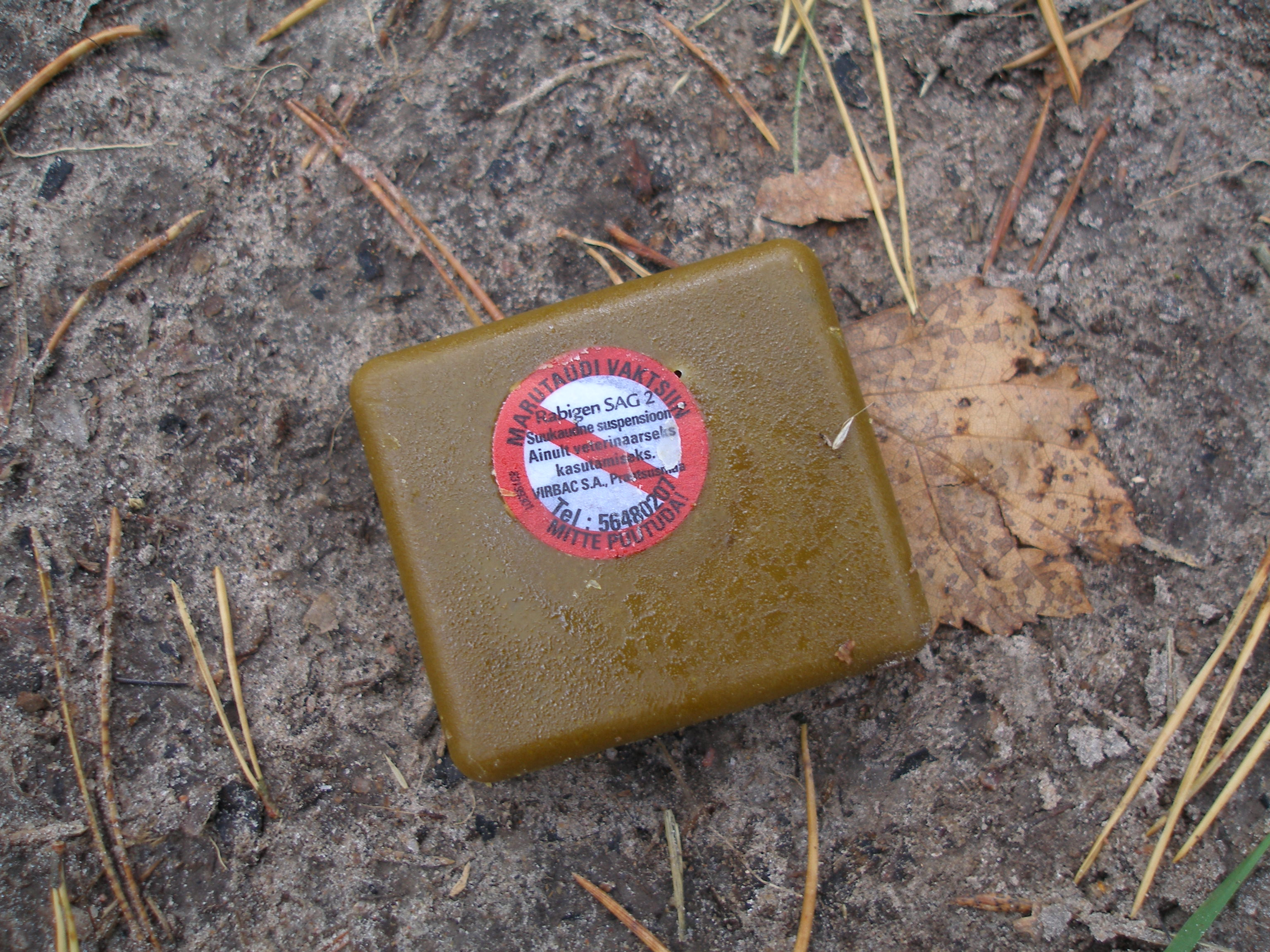
Oral rabies vaccine in bait. Oral vaccination of wildlife is common in the Western World, contributing to the eradication or reduction of rabies prevalence in several regions of the world.

Terrestrial rabies has been eliminated in many European countries, although it is sporadically found in some areas of Europe, mainly in Eastern Europe. In the European Union, all countries are rabies free, except Hungary, Poland, Romania and Slovakia. The latter was previously free of rabies, but has lost its status as a rabies free country, after the reemergence of the disease. There were no rabies cases in Slovakia between August 2006 and January 2013, and between 2016 and September 2022. Among countries outside the EU, Andorra, Iceland, Liechtenstein, Monaco, San Marino, Norway (mainland), Switzerland and the United Kingdom are free of terrestrial rabies, according to the Centers for Disease Control and Prevention. In Western European countries, the presence of lyssaviruses in bats remains the main concern with regard to rabies. In countries of Europe where rabies still occurs in terrestrial animals, red foxes are the main vector.

In the European Union, deaths from rabies in the past decades have been mainly from acquiring the disease abroad, although there have been cases of indigenous acquired human rabies too (from a stray dog in 2025 in Romania, and from a bat in 2019 in France – see sections below). However, the war in Ukraine has led to concerns about a possible rabies outbreak on the continent. Ukraine has reported cases of human deaths due to rabies in 2024 and 2023.

In 2024, in the European Union, in indigenous animals (excluding bats) there were a total of 87 cases: 43 cases in Poland (30 foxes, 4 cats, 3 cattle, 2 raccoon dogs, 2 dogs, 1 marten and 1 roe deer), 25 cases in Romania (11 cattle, 8 dogs and 6 foxes), 18 cases in Hungary (11 foxes, 3 dogs, 2 cats, 1 cattle and 1 jackal) and one case in Slovakia (one fox). The total number of rabies cases in the EU increased in 2024 compared to 2023 and 2022 (both with 70 cases) but was lower than in 2021 (114 cases) and higher than in 2020 (15 cases).

Recent human deaths from indigenous acquired rabies in European countries that are not members of the European Union have occurred in Georgia (2024), Ukraine (2024), Moldova (2019).

Rabies in bats has been reported in Denmark, the Netherlands, Germany, France, Poland, Spain, Switzerland, Great Britain, the Czech Republic, Slovakia, Hungary, Ukraine, Russia, Norway and Finland. There has been little research in this area, compared to terrestrial rabies, but according to the European Rabies Bulletin, "it can be assumed that bat rabies occurs all over Europe." Bats in Europe can carry European bat lyssavirus 1 (EBLV-1), European bat 2 lyssavirus (EBLV-2), Bokeloh bat lyssavirus (BBLV), West Caucasian bat lyssavirus (WCBV), Lleida bat lyssavirus (LLEBV) and Kotalahti bat lyssavirus. There have been five reported human deaths from rabies acquired from bats in Europe: in Ukraine (1977, species not characterised), Russia (1985, EBLV‐1), Finland (1985, EBLV‐2), the United Kingdom (2002, EBLV‐2) and France (2019, EBLV‐1).

=== Benelux ===
The Netherlands has been designated rabies-free since 1923, and Belgium since 2008. Isolated cases of rabies involving illegally smuggled pets from Africa, as well as infected animals crossing the German and French borders, have occurred.

However, in 2024, a case of rabies was detected in a cat in the Netherlands, with laboratory tests finding the cat had been infected with the European bat lyssavirus 1 (EBLV-1).

=== Baltic states ===
The Baltic states are now officially free of rabies, with the last cases in the region having occurred in 2011 in Estonia, in 2012 in Latvia, and in 2018 in Lithuania (in a dead fox found near the border with Belarus). Nevertheless, since these countries are in proximity to Russia, Belarus and Poland, where rabies still occurs, they are still at risk of a reemergence, and therefore undergo routine maintenance. In addition, in 2019, a woman died in Latvia after having contracted rabies in India.

=== Germany ===
Nine deaths from rabies were reported in Germany between 1981 and 2005. Two were caused by animal bites within Germany (one fox, one dog), and four were acquired abroad. In the remaining three cases, the source was a transplant from an infected donor who had died of heart failure prior to developing rabies symptoms. On 28 September 2008, the World Organisation for Animal Health declared Germany free of rabies.

In 2021, there was a case of rabies in a dog illegally imported to Germany from Turkey.

=== France ===
In 2019, a patient in the Nouvelle-Aquitaine region of France died of rabies believed to have been transmitted by a bat. This was the first death due to bat transmitted rabies in mainland France and the first case of rabies contracted in mainland France since 1924. There have been recent cases of death due to rabies in France after French tourists have contracted the disease abroad. In 2014, a man died of rabies in France after he had visited Mali. In 2017, a ten-year-old child died in France after contracting rabies in Sri Lanka. In 2023, a woman died of rabies in France after being bitten by a cat in Morocco. In 2025, a man died of rabies in Perpignan after returning from a trip to Maghreb.

=== Ireland ===
In 1897 the Disease of Animals Act included provisions to prevent the spread of rabies throughout Ireland. There have been no indigenous cases reported since 1903. In 2009, four people in Dublin received rabies vaccination therapy after being bitten by an imported kitten, although subsequent examination of the kitten yielded a negative result for rabies.

=== Norway ===
The last case of rabies in mainland Norway was in 1826, with the last human rabies case contracted in the country being in 1815. However, on Svalbard, animals can cross the arctic ice from Greenland or Russia, and a case of rabies in an Arctic fox in Pyramiden was detected in 2025. The death of a woman on 6 May 2019 from the rabies virus contracted abroad was reported to be the first in Norway for more than 200 years. She contracted the virus while on holiday with friends in the Philippines, and after being bitten by a stray puppy they had rescued.

=== Spain ===
The first case of rabies since 1978 was confirmed in the city of Toledo, Central Spain, on 5 June 2013. The dog had been imported from Morocco. No human fatalities have been reported, although adults and children were reported to have been bitten by the animal. There was another case in 2019, although the victim was infected in Morocco, after being bitten by a cat.

=== Italy ===
After being declared rabies-free in 1997, Italy saw a new epidemic of rabies in 2008–2011, occurring in foxes in north-eastern Italy. The country was again declared rabies-free in 2013. However, an isolated rabies case occurred in 2020, when a rabid cat was discovered in the Arezzo province. The cat had been infected with the West Caucasian bat lyssavirus (WCBV).

=== Switzerland ===
A rabies epidemic spread by red foxes reached Switzerland in 1967. Multiple solutions were tried; baiting foxes with chicken heads laced with vaccine proved to be the most successful. Switzerland has been rabies free since the 1990s.

=== United Kingdom ===
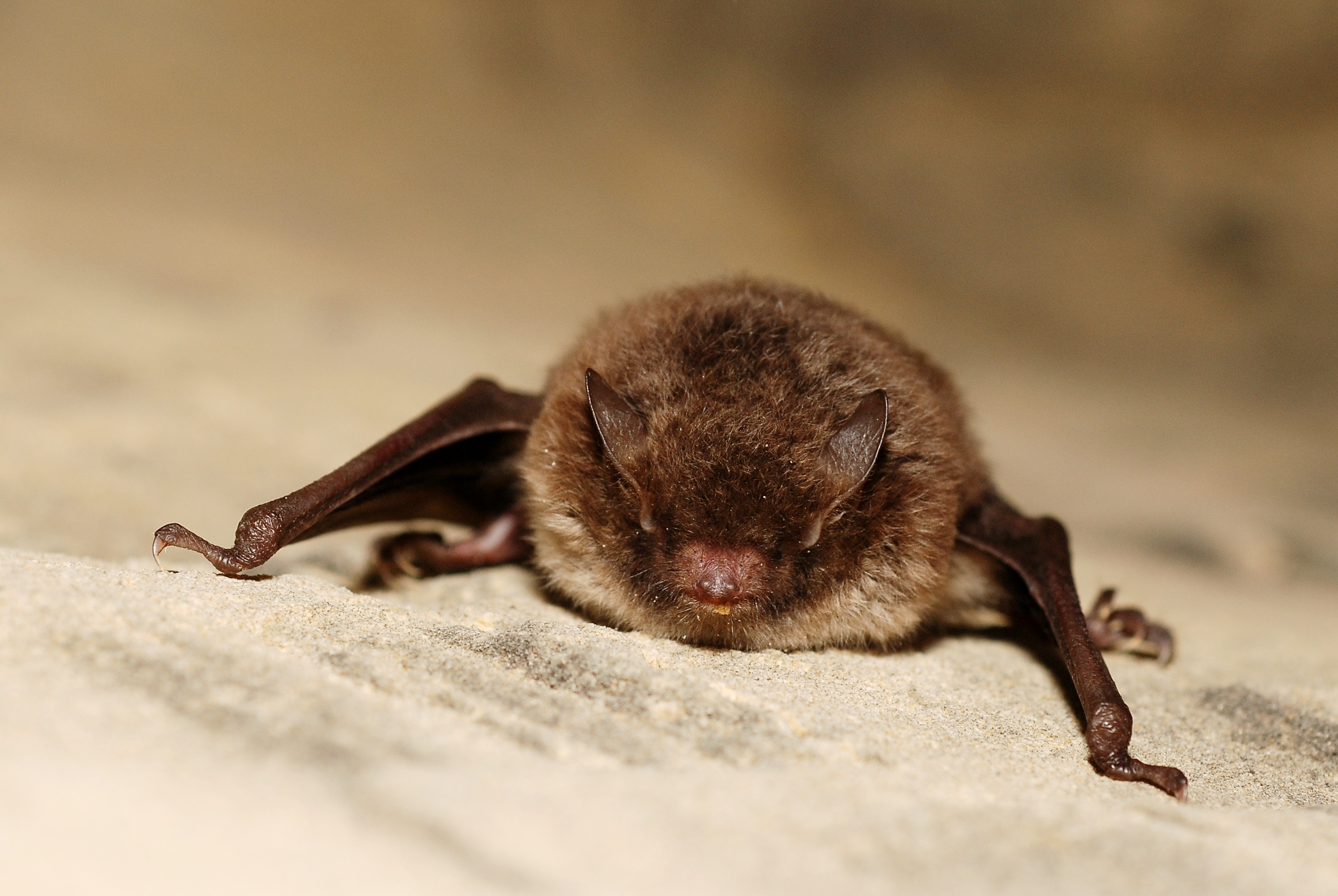
Daubenton's bats carry rabies in the UK.

The UK was declared rabies free in 1902 but there were further outbreaks after 1918 when servicemen returning from war smuggled rabid dogs back to Britain from France and Belgium. The disease was subsequently re-eradicated and Britain was declared rabies-free in 1922 after the introduction of compulsory quarantine for dogs.

Since 1902, there have been 27 deaths in the UK from rabies (excluding the European bat lyssavirus 2 case discussed below). A case in 1902 occurred shortly before the eradication of rabies from the UK, and no details were recorded for a case in 1919. All other cases of rabies caused by rabies virus acquired the infection while abroad. Sixteen cases (62%) involved infections acquired in India, Pakistan or Bangladesh, with the remainder of infections originating in Africa and Southeast Asia.

Since 2000, several deaths from rabies have occurred; none of these cases had received any post-exposure prophylactic treatment. In 2001, there were two deaths from infections acquired in Nigeria and the Philippines. One death occurred in 2005 from an infection acquired by a dog bite in Goa (western India). A woman died on 6 January 2009 in Belfast, Northern Ireland. She is believed to have been infected in South Africa, probably from being scratched by a dog. Prior to this, the last reported human case of the disease in Northern Ireland was in 1938. More recently, there was a case of dog-acquired human rabies in a woman who died on 28 May 2012 in London after being bitten by a dog in South Asia. In 2018, a man died of rabies after contracting the virus from a cat in Morocco. In June 2025, a woman died in Yorkshire after having had contact with a puppy in Morocco in February of that year.

A rabies-like lyssavirus, called European bat lyssavirus 2, was identified in bats in 2003. In 2002, there was a fatal case in a bat handler involving infection with European bat lyssavirus 2; infection was probably acquired from a bite from a bat in Scotland.

=== Hungary ===
In 2023, there were 15 cases of animal rabies in Hungary (9 foxes, 3 dogs, 2 cattle and 1 cat). The last human rabies case in Hungary occurred in 1994.

=== Balkans ===
Rabies is very rare in the Balkans region, although sporadic cases have occurred in some countries in the region in red foxes and stray dogs.

In Serbia, in 2017 and 2020, campaigns for fox-mediated rabies prevention were missed, leading to isolated cases of rabies. There were plans to re-implement these campaigns in 2021–2022, and these campaigns are ongoing. Canine mediated human rabies has been eliminated since 1980, and lyssaviruses have not been found in bat populations since 1954. The last human death due to rabies occurred in 1980 (following a dog bite), while the last case of rabies detected in a dog was in 2011. Rabies was detected in a fox in 2018.

In Bosnia and Herzegovina, after more than six years of absence of rabies in the country, in 2020 a rabid dog was detected near Srebrenica, 6 km from the border with Serbia.

Croatia is considered rabies free, with the last case of rabies being in 2014, in a red fox, and the country has been continually undergoing internal maintenance to ensure rabies is eradicated. The last human death due to indigenously acquired rabies was in 1964, but there were two human deaths from rabies in 1989 and 1995, both of them acquired in Bosnia and Herzegovina.

Slovenia is also rabies free, having successfully eradicated the disease through oral vaccination of wildlife, with the last rabies case occurring in 2013.

In Bulgaria, the last case of rabies occurred in 2014 in a red fox. The last case of rabies in a dog occurred in 2010. Nevertheless, Bulgaria borders Romania and Turkey, both of which still have rabies.

In Greece, after the country had been rabies-free since 1987, rabies re-emerged in Northern Greece in 2012. The outbreak lasted until 2014, with the last case being in a red fox in May 2014 in the Pella regional unit. The last human death due to rabies in Greece was in 1970.

=== Romania ===
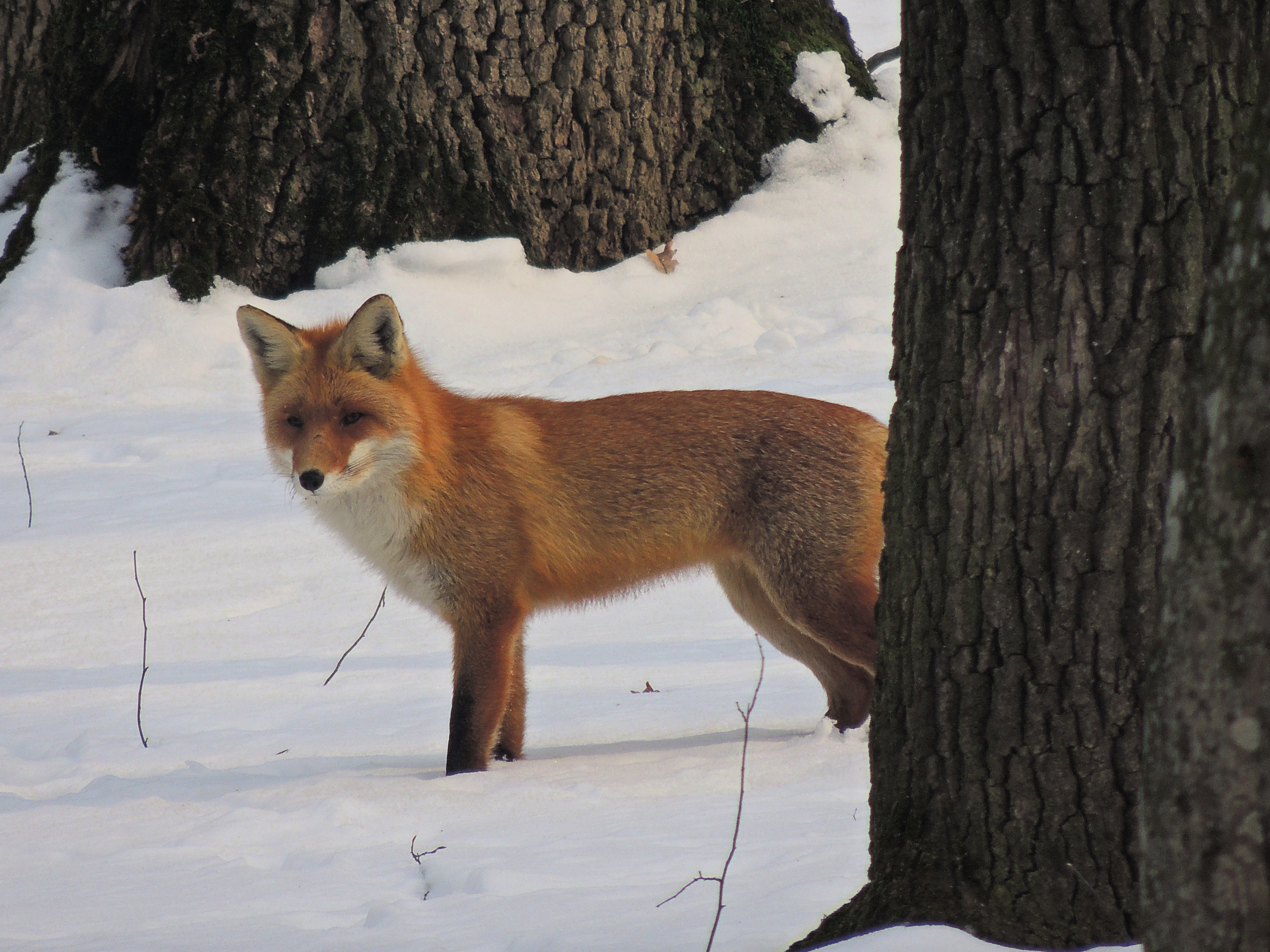
A fox in Romania. Foxes and stray dogs are considered to be at highest risk of rabies in Romania.

The last case of human death due to rabies in Romania happened in 2025, when a man in Iași County died, after being bitten by a rabid stray dog. This was the first case of human death due to rabies in 13 years, with the previous case having occurred in 2012, when a 5-year-old girl from Bacău County was bitten by a stray dog. Although human deaths due to rabies are rare in Romania due to prompt administering of post-exposure prophylaxis jabs, rabies continues to be present in Romania. In 2024, there were 25 cases of animal rabies detected in Romania (11 cattle, 8 dogs and 6 foxes). Most rabies cases occur in the North of the country and in Western Moldavia, but in 2024, a rabies case in a dog with an owner was discovered in Bucharest. Romanian law obligates owners of dogs and cats to vaccinate them against rabies, although some owners ignore the law. Romanian law also requires certain breeds of dogs to wear a muzzle when appearing in public. Rabies in Romania is especially present in foxes. Since 2007, Romania has implemented a national program of oral vaccination of foxes.

In 2025, Iași County struggled with a major rabies outbreak. This included a human death (see above), as well as the introduction of a roe deer, later discovered to be rabid, into the Faculty of Veterinary Medicine of Iași, which required the subsequent vaccination of 80 people who had come into contact with that animal. During the summer of 2025, the Clinical Hospital for Infectious Diseases "Sfânta Parascheva" of Iași spend 22% of its total medication budget on rabies related medical services.

The number of rabies cases varies by year in Romania. During the period 2008-2012, six people died of rabies (two cases contracted from cats, one from a dog, one from a fox, one from a wolf, and one from an undisclosed animal).

Romania's close relations with France in the 19th century and the first part of the 20th century meant that Romania was early to adopt the rabies vaccine for humans (which was invented by French scientist Louis Pasteur in 1885), with Romania creating an anti-rabies center in Bucharest in 1888. The center, which was established by Victor Babeș, was the second such center in the world. However, Romania continues to struggle with rabies, with animal cases being discovered annually, due to a variety of factors, including a large population of mammals, especially in the Carpathian Mountains, and Romania's geopolitical location, with the war in Ukraine potentially increasing risks.

=== Moldova ===
Rabies is present in Moldova. In recent years there have been two human deaths due to rabies transmitted from dogs (in 2016 and 2019) and one human rabies death due to transmission from a marten (2003).

=== Caucasus ===
Rabies is present in the Caucasus region. In recent years, Armenia has taken proactive measures in order to prevent rabies. It has enacted a program through which stray dogs in several parts of the country have been sterilized and/or vaccinated, and it has created animal shelters for dogs. However, in the period between January and October 2025, there were two cases of human rabies, while during the same months of 2023 and 2024 there were no human rabies cases. Cases in animals occur yearly. In 2022 and 2023 there were three and eight rabies cases in dogs, respectively. In Georgia, there are up to 50 confirmed animal rabies cases per year. Human deaths due to rabies have occurred recently in Georgia, including in 2024, when a woman died due to rabies in a village of near Ambrolauri, the first case of human rabies since November 2022. A study analyzed the human rabies cases in Georgia in the period between 2007 and 2023. It found that in the period of 2007-2014 there were, on average, 5 human cases of rabies per year; while in the period of 2015-2023, the incidence dropped significantly, with an average of only one case of human rabies per year. The highest number of cases was in 2007 with 10 cases, while in some years there were no cases.

=== Turkey ===
Rabies is still prevalent in Turkey, where since 2018, one to two cases have been reported a year. Vaccines are still being administered, with summer being the season where potential rabies contact is the most common.

== Oceania ==
=== Australia ===
Australia is free of rabies. There have been two confirmed human deaths from the disease, in 1987 and 1990. Both were contracted overseas. However, the closely related Australian bat lyssavirus (ABLV) has caused four deaths since its discovery in 1996; the most recent of these was in 2025, when a man died after he was bitten by a bat in New South Wales. Prior to this case, the previous case was in 2013, when an 8-year-old Queensland boy was scratched on the wrist by an infected bat, developing ABLV and dying 2 months afterwards. There is also a report of an 1867 case. Public health officials have expressed concern that the arrival of rabies in Australia is likely, given its widespread presence in nearby Indonesia.

== Rabies-free jurisdictions ==
Map of rabies-free countries and territories

Many countries and territories have been declared to be free of rabies. The Centers for Disease Control and Prevention published the following list on 2021 based on countries and territories that are free of rabies.

- Africa: Cape Verde, Mayotte, Ceuta, Réunion, Saint Helena
- Americas: Falkland Islands, Galápagos Islands, South Georgia and the South Sandwich Islands
- Asia: Bahrain, British Indian Ocean Territory, Hong Kong SAR, Japan, Macau SAR, Maldives, Singapore
- Europe: Andorra, Austria, Azores, Belgium, Bulgaria, Canary Islands, Croatia, Cyprus, Czech Republic, Denmark, Estonia, Faroe Islands, Finland, France, Germany, Gibraltar, Greece, Iceland, Ireland, Italy, Latvia, Liechtenstein, Lithuania, Luxembourg, Madeira, Malta, Monaco, Netherlands, Norway (except Svalbard), Portugal, San Marino, Slovakia, Slovenia, Spain, Sweden, Switzerland, United Kingdom
- Oceania: Easter Island, American Samoa, Australia, Christmas Island, Cocos (Keeling) Islands, Cook Islands, Fiji, French Polynesia, Guam, Kiribati, Marshall Islands, Micronesia, Nauru, New Caledonia, New Zealand, Niue, Norfolk Island, Northern Mariana Islands, Palau, Pitcairn Islands, Samoa, Solomon Islands, Tokelau, Tonga, Tuvalu, Vanuatu, Wake Island
- Antarctica: Antarctica (generally believed)

New Zealand and Australia have never had rabies. However, in Australia, the closely related Australian bat lyssavirus occurs normally in both insectivorous and fruit-eating bats (flying foxes) from most mainland states. Scientists believe it is present in bat populations throughout the range of flying foxes in Australia. Rabies has also never been reported in Cook Islands, Jersey in the Channel Islands, mainland Norway, Saint Vincent and the Grenadines and Vanuatu.

== Managing stray animals ==
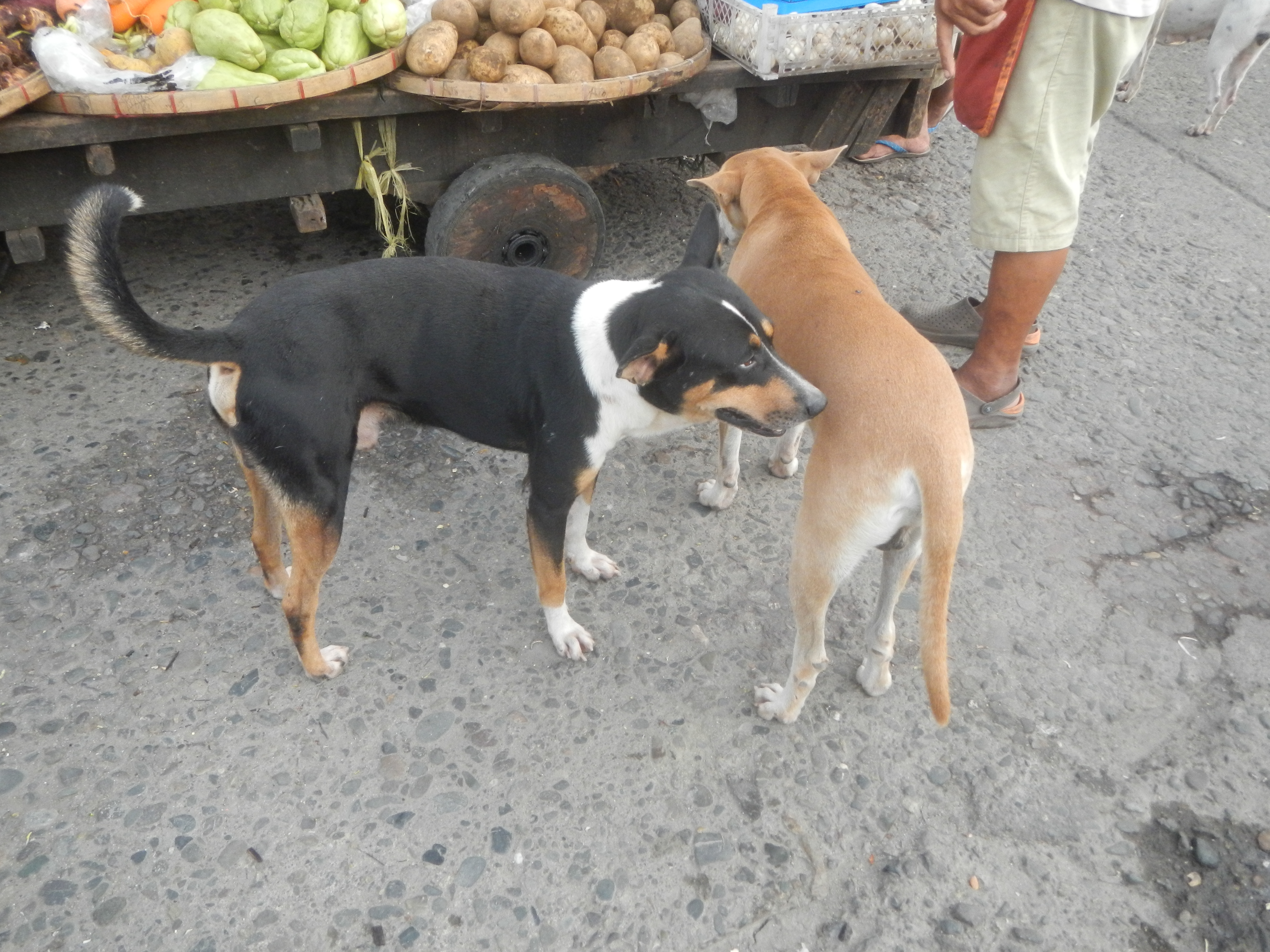
Stray askals in the Philippines. Lack of awareness about rabies prevention can lead to tourists dying from contracting the disease.

Managing stray animals, especially stray dogs, is crucial for the prevention of rabies. A policy of "catch–neuter–vaccinate–return", where the stray animals are captured, sterilized, vaccinated, and then released back on the streets, can be effective in preventing rabies. It is considered a humane policy and it is advocated by animal rights organizations such as Four Paws. However, there are challenges to managing and delivering rabies vaccinations to stray dogs, including costs, the short duration of vaccine immunity and the insufficient coverage with regard to number of dogs in a community. A simplified and cheaper policy of only sterilizing the stray animals, enacted in some jurisdictions, helps reduce their numbers in time, but slows down the rabies eradication efforts. Euthanasia of stray animals is a controversial policy, but it is practiced in many countries; in the United States, every year, about 390,000 dogs and 530,000 cats in shelters are euthanized. Alternatively, stray animals may be kept indefinitely in no kill shelters. In addition, educating tourists about coming into contact with potentially rabid stray animals abroad is also necessary in order to prevent rabies. Since 1990, over 80 American tourists have died from rabies after being exposed while traveling abroad.

The COVID-19 pandemic has worsened the rabies situation in some parts of the world, since it has interfered with both the policies of management of stray animals and with the access of post-exposure prophylaxis (PEP) for humans.

== Human rabies acquired from animals other than dogs or bats ==
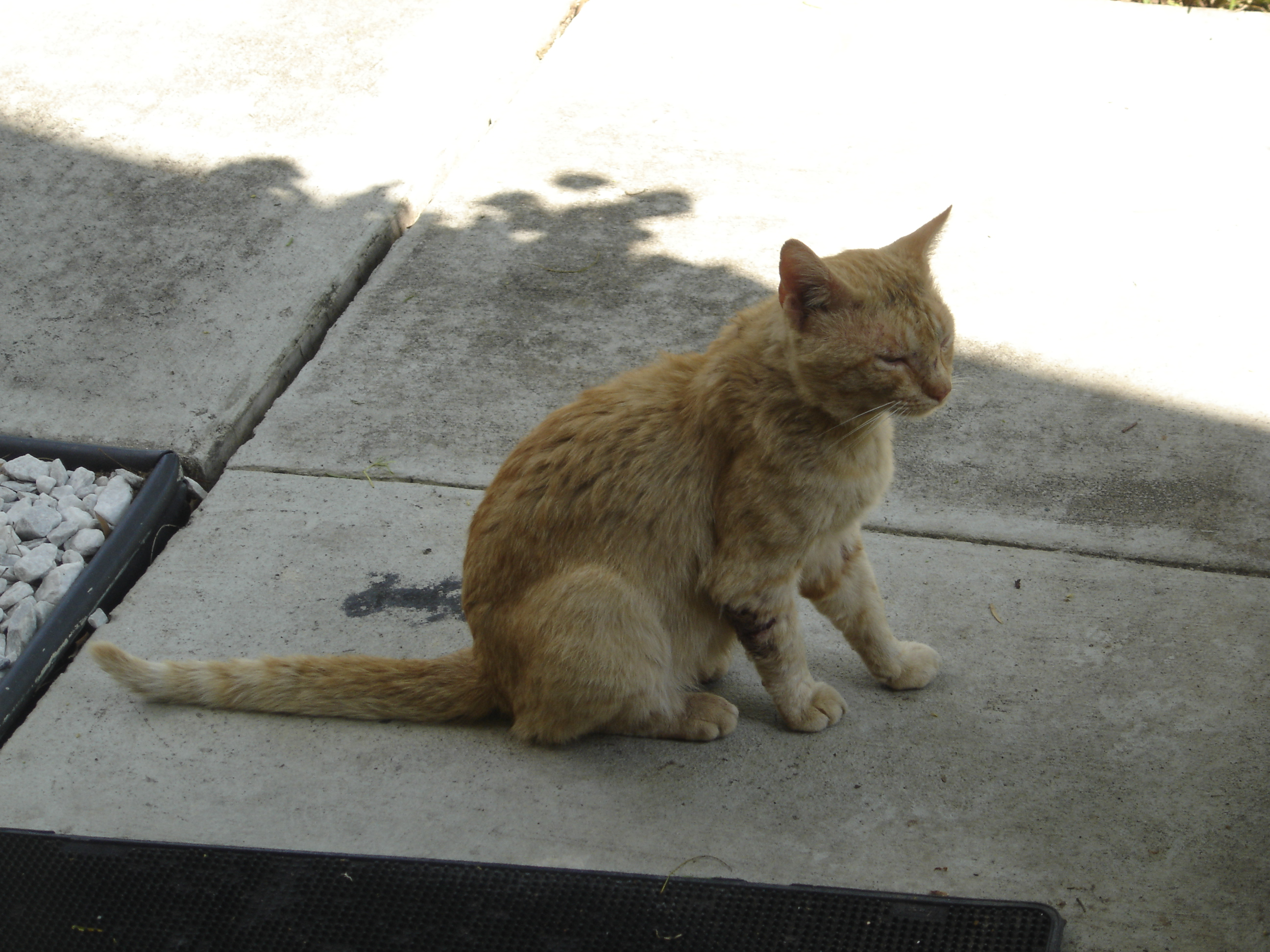
A feral cat in Texas

Since rabies is most commonly acquired from dogs or bats, animal bites from other animals are often dismissed by the population and sometimes even by medical staff. For example, in 2018, after a British man died of rabies after being bitten by a cat in Morocco, it was reported that the man had not been advised by medical staff to undergo rabies post-exposure prophylaxis in either Morocco or the United Kingdom. A report on rabies in Romania found that "People should be educated that cats in rural areas or in the vicinity of forests pose the same level of risk as dogs or wild animals." In 2003, in neighboring Moldova, there was a human death from rabies acquired from a marten.

While rabies is commonly associated with dogs and other canids such as foxes, coyotes, jackals, wolves and raccoon dogs, it can affect almost all mammals.

== Prevention and education ==
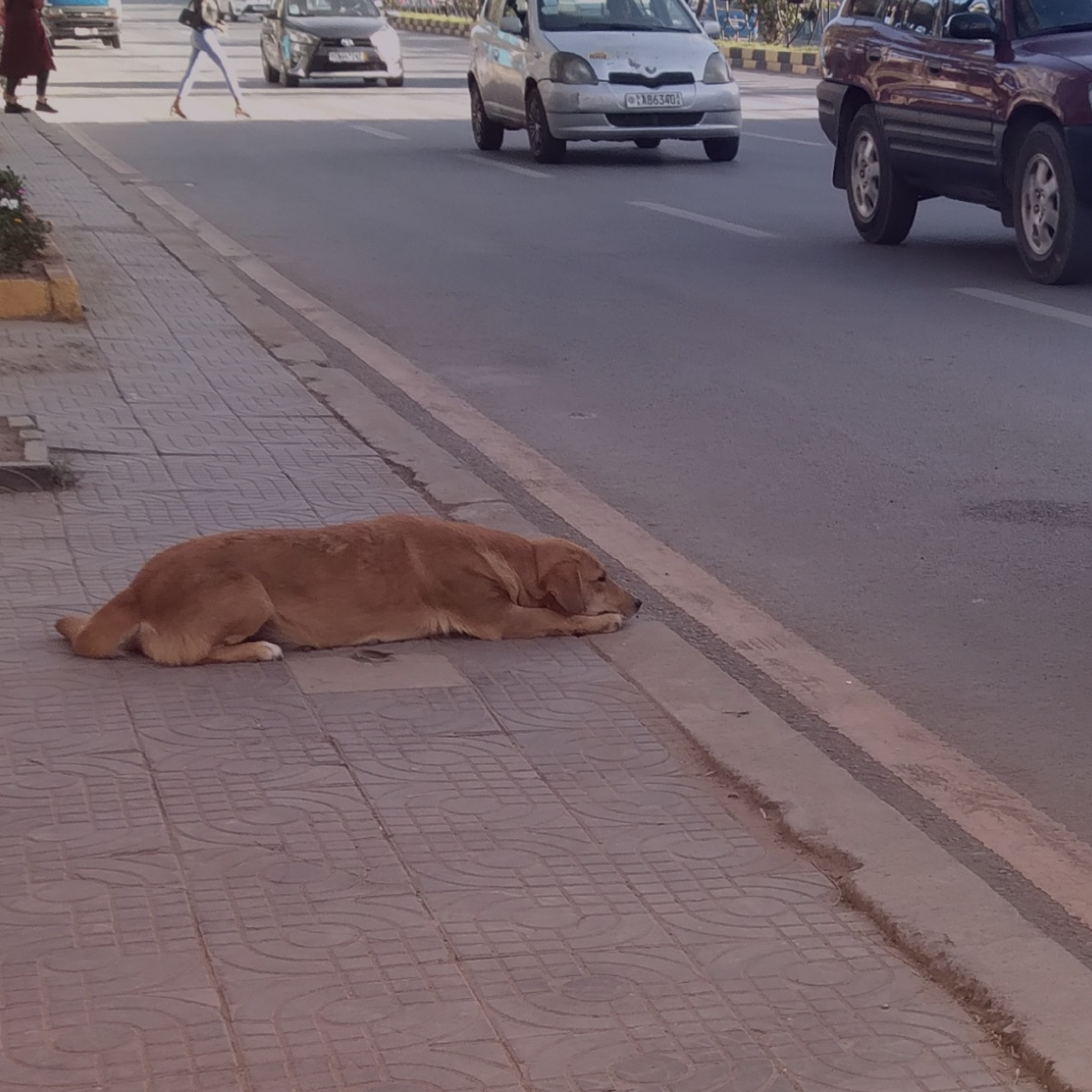
Caution is needed when interacting with stray animals, especially in places where rabies is endemic.

Prevention of rabies includes vaccinating animals (through programs of pet, farm and ranch animals vaccination and oral vaccination of wildlife), ensuring access to post-exposure prophylaxis for people potentially exposed to rabies, and educating the population, including medical personnel, about rabies. Pre-exposure prophylaxis (PrEP) for rabies (preventative rabies vaccines) is recommended for people who are tourists who travel to areas where rabies is endemic (especially if they plan to spend time in remote areas away from major urban centers) and for people who may be exposed professionally to rabies, such as people who work with animals, laboratory workers, spelunkers. While PrEP does not eliminate the need for post-exposure prophylaxis (PEP) (the life-saving treatment needed after being bitten by a potentially rabid animal), PrEP simplifies the post-exposure prophylaxis treatment needed. PrEP removes the need for rabies immunoglobulin (RIG), which is very relevant since RIG is often difficult to find in developing countries (where post-exposure prophylaxis often does not include RIG, which still has a high rate of success, but in some cases may result in failure), reduces the number of post-exposure vaccines needed, and may increase the window during which the treatment can be given, since there is already a level of immunity, therefore gaining time for people who are far from places where they can receive treatment and may have to travel to the capital city of the country or abroad (although treatment should still be given as soon as possible).
