= West Caucasian bat virus =

Virus classification
- (unranked): Virus
- Realm: Riboviria
- Kingdom: Orthornavirae
- Phylum: Negarnaviricota
- Class: Monjiviricetes
- Order: Mononegavirales
- Family: Rhabdoviridae
- Genus: Lyssavirus
- Species: Lyssavirus caucasicus

Synonyms
- West Caucasian bat lyssavirus

Species of virus

West Caucasian bat virus (WCBV) is a member of genus Lyssavirus, family Rhabdoviridae and order Mononegavirales. This virus was first isolated from Miniopterus schreibersii, in the western Caucasus Mountains of southeastern Europe in 2002. WCBV is the most divergent form of Lyssavirus, and is found in Miniopterus bats (insectivorous). The virus is fragile as it can be inactivated by UV light and chemicals, such as ether, chloroform, and bleach. WCBV has not been known to infect humans thus far.

== Classification ==
The lyssavirus genus can be divided into two phylogroups based upon RNA sequence homology. Phylogroup I includes viruses, such as Rabies virus, Duvenhage virus, European bat lyssavirus types 1 and 2, Australian bat lyssavirus, Khujand virus, Bokeloh bat lyssavirus, Irkut virus, and Aravan virus. Phylogroup II contains Lagos bat virus, Mokola virus, and Shimoni bat virus. West Caucasian bat virus, Lleida bat lyssavirus, and Ikoma lyssavirus are not members of either of these phylogroups.

== Discovery ==
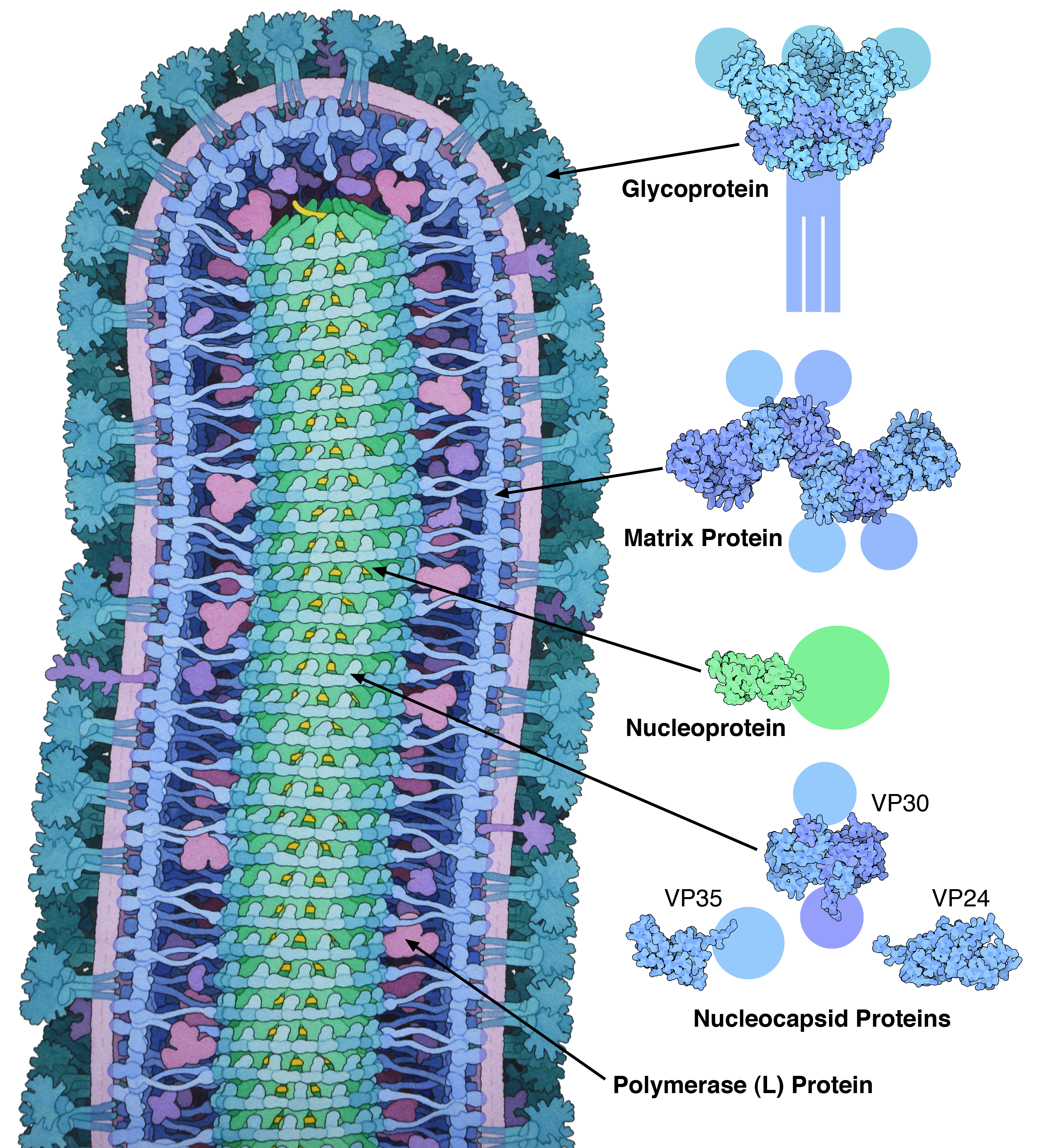
This image shows an example of the structure of a negative sense single stranded RNA virus with a glycoprotein.

WCBV was discovered in 2002 in the Caucasus region of south-western Russia, where it was isolated from a Schreibers' long-fingered bat, and later in a cat in Italy.

== Virus structure ==
West Caucasian bat virus is a bullet shaped negative sense single stranded RNA virus. WCBL is composed of an internal helical nucleocapsid and a lipid envelope derived from the host cell. The virus contains knobbed spikes that protrude from the membrane to aid in host membrane fusion. In addition, WCBL, along with other lyssaviruses, has a glycoprotein which is important in mediating viral entry.

== Virus genome ==
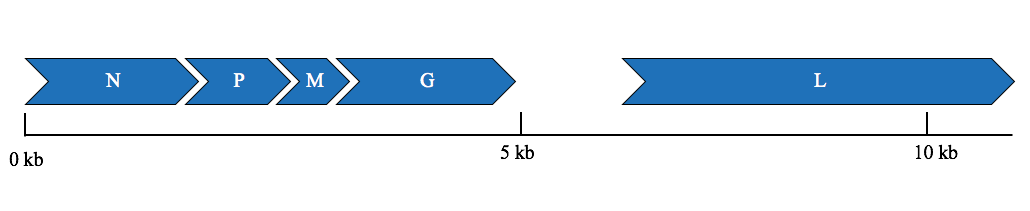
This is an image of the genome of West Caucasian bat virus, which comprises five main genes: N, P, M, G, and L.

The WCBL contains a linear genome that is 12,278 base pairs in length and comprises five main genes, denoted N, P, M, G, and L. Gene N encodes for the nucleoprotein, P encodes for the phosphoprotein, M encodes for matrix proteins, G encodes for the glycoprotein, and L encodes for the polymerase. WCBV must encode for an RNA-dependent RNA polymerase (RdRp) in its genome in order for viral replication and synthesis to occur because it is a negative single-strand RNA virus. In comparison to other lyssaviruses, WCBV has a shorter trailer region of 57 nucleotides (as opposed to 69–70), but a longer non-coding region specifically in the glycoprotein gene at 697 nucleotides. These differences have resulted in its classification into its own phylogroup. The West Caucasian bat virus also contains an open reading frame within the G gene which led researchers to believe parts of the glycoprotein were transcribed independently. However, a lack of a transcription initiation signal near the internal open reading frame has since confirmed that the glycoprotein is not transcribed in separate segments.

== Replication cycle and interaction with the host ==
The replication cycle for WCBV has not been specifically studied; however, it is said to be very similar to that of general lyssavirus, so the information listed below is regarding the genus as a whole.

=== Entry into cell ===
In order for lyssaviruses to enter into a host cell, the virus must attach to the host cell's receptor. This process is facilitated by the viral glycoprotein. Researchers are still unaware of the specific receptor WCBV uses to gain entry into the host cell. Upon receptor activation, clathrin mediated endocytosis is provoked in which the cell absorbs the contents of the virus, including proteins. Next, the virus fuses to the vesicle membrane, allowing the viral nucleocapsid to enter into the cytoplasm of the host cell. The phosphoprotein of WCBV can attach to cytoplasmic dynein LC8 for transport to the nucleus for viral replication.

=== Replication and transcription ===
Next, the RNA-dependent RNA polymerase (RdRp) binds to the RNA genome and transcribes the five viral genes. In other words, the DNA is copied into a new strand of mRNA that will then hijack host cell translational machinery to synthesize proteins. Viral mRNA is capped and polyadenylated, which is the attachment of a string of adenine nucleotides to the 3’ end of the protein. The adenylation increases the half-life of the protein in order to regulate the activity.

=== Assembly and release ===
Further, assembly of the virus starts when there is enough nucleoprotein (N) to encapsulate the genome. The virus is then released into non-nervous tissue. It is not easily detected due to the fact that it does not stimulate the immune system immediately. The incubation period can last anywhere from a few days to several months. After this time frame, it can move into the peripheral nervous system (PNS), and can eventually travel to the central nervous system (CNS) via the axonal transport system. At that point, it is possible to see clinical signs, such as weakness and lethargy due to encephalitis. Death often results several days after symptoms emerge.

== Associated diseases ==
WCBV is closely related to rabies. Although, WCBV has not yet infected humans, there is great risk due to its similar structure to other lyssaviruses which are known to infect humans. Unfortunately, the current rabies vaccine is not effective against WCBV as a result of the WCBV's slight divergence from other lyssaviruses. Therefore, if this virus begins to infect humans, the rabies vaccine will need to be improved to include effective antibodies for WCBV.

== Tropism ==
WCBV initially infects muscle tissue in the bats. As the virus progresses, it moves into the nervous tissue in both the PNS and CNS. Although no studies have been completed thus far on the mammalian tropism of the WCBV virus, tropism for another more recently discovered lyssavirus, Australian Bat lyssavirus (ABLV) has been explored. A variety of mammalian cell types including rabbits, other small rodents, monkeys, horses, and humans have shown to be permissive to ABLV. This led researchers to believe that the receptor of entry is likely conserved across several mammalian species. More research is necessary to determine if a variety of mammalian cell types are also permissive WCBV.

== Outbreaks ==
There have been a few cases of outbreaks of WCBV. One was noted in Russia in 2002, which is the year that the virus was isolated. A possible outbreak was noted in Kenya in 2008.

== Susceptibility and pathogenesis in bats ==
In order to gain an understanding of the susceptibility and pathogenesis of the West Caucasian bat virus, big brown bats (Eptesicus fuscus) were inoculated with the virus intramuscularly in the deltoid muscle, in the neck, or orally. Blood and saliva samples were taken during disease progression and tissue samples were analyzed post-mortem. Specific tissues of interest included the brain, salivary glands, brown fat, lung, kidney, and bladder. Three bats died during the lethargic stage of viral infection (days 10 to 18), all of which were inoculated in the neck. Of those that died, only the tissue samples from the brain contained the infectious virus. However, both lung and salivary gland tissue contained viral RNA. Two of the three bats had viral RNA present in the bladder and in brown fat tissue as well. None of these three bats had viral RNA present in the kidney. All bats that survived were euthanized at 6 months. No viral particles were detected in the brain and salivary gland tissue samples of these bats. Of all the bats surveyed, only one of the three that died from viral infection had viral RNA present in the saliva at the time of death.

WCBV antibodies were found in the serum of 4 of 7 bats that received intramuscular inoculation from a few weeks post-inoculation to the end of observation at 6 months. Those that died as a result of infection did not have any WCBV antibodies, a likely result of a shorter incubation period experienced from neck inoculation. None of the bats inoculated orally developed a serological response or the disease. This study indicates that the progression of WCBV infection is dependent on the location of inoculation. Further research is needed to develop a more complete understanding of inoculation route, pathogen adaptation, and host response.
