= European Bat lyssavirus =

European Bat lyssavirus may refer to:

- European Bat lyssavirus 1
- European Bat lyssavirus 2
