= Rabies in Haiti =

Viral disease in Haiti

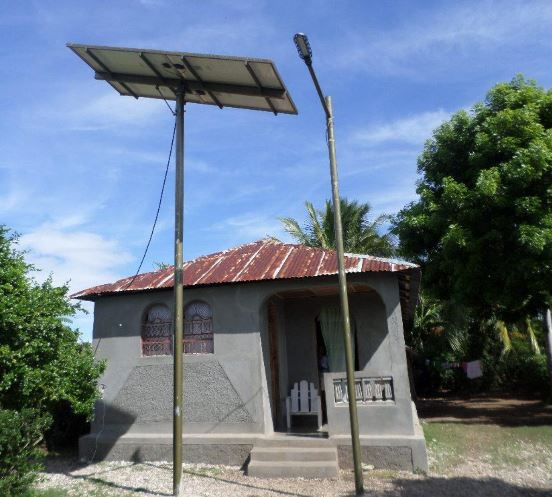
- Haitian clinic where solar power is used to refrigerate the rabies vaccine
- Specialty: Infectious disease
- Symptoms: Fever, fear of water, confusion
- Causes: Rabies virus
- Prevention: Rabies vaccine, animal control, rabies immunoglobulin
- Prognosis: Nearly always death
- Deaths: 17,400 (2015)

Rabies is a viral disease that exists in Haiti and throughout the world. It often causes fatal inflammation of the brain in humans and other mammals, such as dogs and mongooses in Haiti. The term "rabies" is derived from a Latin word that means "to rage"; rabid animals sometimes appear to be angry. Early symptoms can include fever and tingling at the site of exposure, followed by one or more of the following symptoms: violent movements, uncontrolled excitement, fear of water, an inability to move parts of the body, confusion, and loss of consciousness. Once symptoms appear, death is nearly always the outcome. The time period between contracting the disease and showing symptoms is usually one to three months; however, this time period can vary from less than a week to more than a year. The time between contraction and the onset of symptoms is dependent on the distance the virus must travel to reach the central nervous system.

Haiti is one of five remaining countries in the Americas where canine rabies is still a problem, and it has the highest rate of human rabies deaths in the Western Hemisphere. Following the 2010 earthquake, rabies caused an estimated two deaths per week. Only a small number of these rabies deaths were reported to health authorities due to the impact of the earthquake, limitations in testing capacity, and lack of awareness and education about the disease among Haitians.

== Epidemiology ==
Globally, 59,000 people die from rabies each year. This is the equivalent of one person dying every nine minutes, with half of the people who die from rabies being under the age of 15. The Pan American Health Organization (PAHO) and the Pan American Center of foot-and-mouth disease (PANAFTOSA) led a mission to eliminate dog-mediated rabies in the American region by 2015. These organizations are cognizant of the regional control of rabies. The PAHO and PANAFTOSA visited Haiti in early December, 2013, and the objectives of the mission were to assess the status of Haiti's rabies program as delivered by the Haitian Ministry of Agriculture, Natural Resources and Rural Development (MARNDR) and the Ministry of Health (MSPP). The mission was to seek opportunities for collaboration between Haiti, Brazil, and the Centers for Disease Control and Prevention (CDC) in Haiti.

Even in 2017, rabies in Haiti is still identified as a national problem, even with PEP proposed.

== Treatment ==
In Haiti, few cases of human rabies are reported to health authorities. In 2016, a report of a woman who had been exposed to rabies three months prior and was showing symptoms went to the hospital where no treatment was administered to her. Even after being reported to both the CDC and the national Department of Epidemiology and Laboratory Research (DELR), as required by Haiti's surveillance program, the woman died. This goes to show the lack of communication and effectiveness in caring for human subjects in Haiti, and the continued focus is on eliminating dog-mediated rabies altogether.

Human diploid cell culture rabies vaccine (HDCV) and purified chick embryo cell culture rabies vaccine (PCEC) are used to treat post-exposure immunization against a human rabies infection. Recommendations for treatment are given by governmental health care organizations and in health literature. Health care providers are encouraged to administer a regimen of four 1-mL doses of HDCV or PCEC vaccines. According to the CDC, these injections should be administered intramuscularly to persons who have not yet been vaccinated for rabies.

For those who are unvaccinated, the first of four doses is administered immediately after exposure to the rabies virus. Additional doses are given three, seven, and fourteen days after the first vaccination. Exposure usually means a bite from a rabid animal.

At an individual patient level, post-exposure prophylaxis (PEP) consists of local treatment of the wound, vaccination, and administration of immunoglobulin, if necessary. At the program level, several components are critical, including: adequate and prompt recognition of the need for PEP by the public, if exposed, and by health officials, prompt and sufficient availability of high-quality PEP, and adequate follow-up of PEP use. Health officials' awareness of the need for PEP after a dog bite can only be achieved if the exposure is attended to immediately and communicated effectively.

== Animal treatment ==
Dog vaccination is most effective for controlling dog-mediated rabies. This can be seen throughout the region of the Americas where medical authorities have achieved rabies control.

In Haiti, the United States Centers for Disease Control (CDC) is mainly focusing on dog-mediated rabies. Specifically in collaboration with the NGO Christian Veterinary Mission, the CDC has trained, to date, more than 20 MARNDR laboratory personnel in rabies diagnostic methods (Direct Fluorescent Antibody [DFA] and Direct Rapid Immunohistochemistry Test [dRIT]). The organizations have also improved a diagnostic laboratory in Port-au-Prince by providing it with advanced equipment. The surveillance system is a bite-reporting model where the public and medical providers report bite events to rabies control officers. In addition, more than 30 field veterinary and health agents were trained in rabies surveillance, in support of this effort.

In 2011, the CDC along with MARNDR initiated a five-year rabies infrastructure improvement program that focused on surveillance, diagnostics, and education. The MSPP also helped out by improving public education on rabies. Because Haiti has a gross national income per capita of US$1,035, it is the only country in the American region that is part of the group of low-income countries. The World Bank has classified 33 other low-income countries in Africa and Asia, where dog-mediated rabies is a major problem and results in thousands of deaths annually. The persistence of dog rabies is connected to limited resources and weak governance.

In conducting a rabies assessment, rabies control officers try to locate the offending animal. Animals that have bitten a victim are either euthanized and tested or quarantined for 14 days while remaining in their owner's residence. In addition, animals who show signs of rabies are tested, regardless of human exposure. This surveillance program is restricted to two of the ten geographical departments of the country (West and Artibonite) for security reasons. The area includes approximately 50 percent of the Haitian population. The CDC and the NGO Christian Veterinary Mission support the mission by maintaining four Haitian staff in the West Department and three in the Artibonite Department, respectively. Results of this mission showed the level of under-reporting of canine rabies. Specifically, six cases of rabid dogs in early December, 2012, were reported for the country.

During the first nine months of the surveillance mission, 42 rabid dogs were identified in just three communities in Port-au-Prince during the first nine months in 2012. That being said, no laboratory-based surveillance exists for the human population that is exposed to rabies and all diagnoses are based on clinical history. This is because of the lack of laboratory facilities, making it difficult to identify evidence for the virus in humans and shed light on the disease as a whole for them, in Haiti. There are insufficient numbers of pathologists to collect samples for human rabies, as well. There do exist other methods for viral antigen detection that may merit study.

In 2013, the CDC and its partners began an animal rabies surveillance program in several regions of Haiti and saw an 18-fold rise in detection of rabid animals. In 2015, the CDC evaluated Haiti's canine rabies vaccination program and found that only 45 percent of dogs were vaccinated, far short of the 70 percent needed to stop the spread of rabies in the dog population. In addition, the researchers found that Haiti had nearly 1,000,000 dogs, twice as many as previously thought.

The CDC and its partners had already begun a dog vaccination trial in evaluating the best vaccination methods for dogs in Haiti. As a part of this effort, they vaccinated 3,000 dogs in just four days during the summer of 2016 and planned to vaccinate a total of 8,000 dogs as part of this campaign.

== Challenges ==
In Haiti, the control of dog rabies is led by the MARNDR while the MSPP manages health-care and rabies prevention in the human population. The separation of these ministries makes it easier for responsibilities to be divided among them. Communication about finding the source of exposure and implementing control methods to prevent further cross-species transmission is also more effective. This task is difficult enough within departments of the same ministry, (e.g., health care and epidemiology), which can be seen in experiences elsewhere. This is why a comprehensive evaluation of Haiti's rabies program should heavily consider the costs and benefits of this separation of responsibilities between the two ministries early on.

Despite a planned mass vaccination for dogs in 2013, no campaign was actually conducted. Authorities in Haiti relied on funds donated by the World Bank for the purchase of approximately 500,000 doses of inactivated, injectable vaccine (IMRAB by Merial). Although the funds were awarded in April 2013, the vaccine itself did not arrive until 2014 when the dog vaccination finally went underway in September 2014. The process as a whole was expected to terminate in January 2015. The lack of manpower needed to deliver faster implementation made it impossible for the campaign to be completed in less than four months.

Another challenge presented is vaccination failure, which usually leads to recurrent rabies in dogs and inconsistent control of the disease. The failures that disrupt annual campaigns or have insufficient coverage, for example, are seen as the main cause for this problem. Another factor is that in Haiti, dog vaccinations have been inconsistently applied. Back in 2012 when the last mass vaccination was led by the MARNDR, approximately 400,000 dogs were vaccinated. With this in mind, considering a current human population of approximately 10,000,000, a relation of one dog per ten people, and aiming to attain 70 percent of vaccine coverage, 700,000 dogs would have to be vaccinated. Assessing the effectiveness of this vaccination campaign is difficult because the dog population figures are unreliable (estimates range from 800,000 to 1,200,000 dogs), and though the overall success seems to be limited.

The number of rabid dogs detected by the MARNDR, MSPP, and CDC is a huge risk to people and is not accurately reflected in their surveillance figures. Although international support is common in both technical help and donations, it is not comprehensive. In addition, the MARNDR, MSPP, and other actors do not communicate effectively because of human resource limitations. That being said, the 2015 elimination goal in the region was compromised and control of the disease could not yet be achieved, despite the efforts of resolute national officials. In conclusion, rabies in the dog population is still a problem and major threat to the Haitian population.
