= Shimoni bat virus =

Virus classification
- (unranked): Virus
- Realm: Riboviria
- Kingdom: Orthornavirae
- Phylum: Negarnaviricota
- Class: Monjiviricetes
- Order: Mononegavirales
- Family: Rhabdoviridae
- Genus: Lyssavirus
- Species: Lyssavirus shimoni

Synonyms
- Shimoni bat lyssavirus

Species of virus

Shimoni bat virus is a Lyssavirus which was discovered in Kenya in 2009. It bears significant similarities to the Lyssavirus Lagos bat virus. The virus was isolated from the brain of a dead Commerson's leaf-nosed bat (Hipposideros commersoni), which is likely the natural reservoir of the virus.
