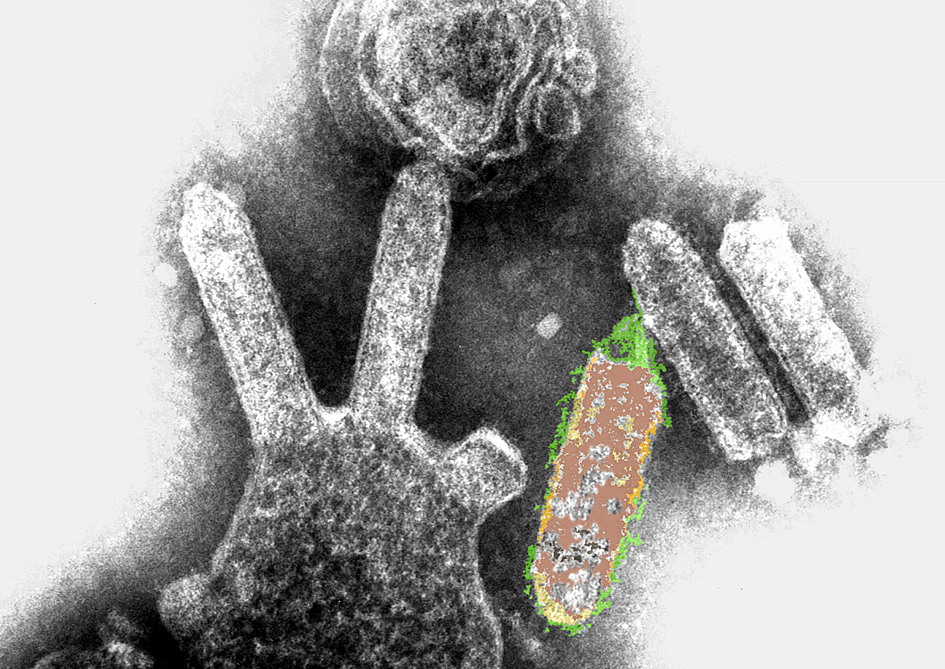
- Colored transmission electron micrograph of Australian bat lyssavirus. The bullet-like objects are the virions, and some of them are budding off from a cell.

Virus classification
- (unranked): Virus
- Realm: Riboviria
- Kingdom: Orthornavirae
- Phylum: Negarnaviricota
- Class: Monjiviricetes
- Order: Mononegavirales
- Family: Rhabdoviridae
- Genus: Lyssavirus

Species
- See text

= Lyssavirus =

Genus of viruses

Lyssavirus (from the Greek λύσσα lyssa "rage, fury, rabies" and the Latin vīrus) is a genus of RNA viruses in the family Rhabdoviridae, order Mononegavirales. Mammals, including humans, can serve as natural hosts. The genus Lyssavirus includes the causative agent (rabies virus) of rabies.

== Phylogeny ==
- Lyssavirus
  - - Phylogroup 1
      - - - - - Gannoruwa bat lyssavirus
              - Rabies virus
            - Australian bat lyssavirus
          - - - - European bat lyssavirus 2
                - Bokeloh bat lyssavirus
              - Khujand virus
        - Aravan virus
      - - - European bat lyssavirus 1
          - Duvenhage virus
        - Irkut virus
    - Phylogroup 2
      - - Lagos bat virus
        - Mokola virus
      - Shimoni bat virus
  - Phylogroup 3
    - - Lleida bat lyssavirus
      - Ikoma lyssavirus
    - West Caucasian bat lyssavirus

Other unclassified viruses are:

- Lyssavirus formosa, Taiwan bat lyssavirus
- Lyssavirus kotalahti, Kotalahti bat lyssavirus
- Lyssavirus phala, Phala bat lyssavirus
- American tree frog lyssavirus (ATFLV)
- Anole lizard lyssavirus (ALLV)

== Virology ==
=== Structure ===
Lyssavirions are enveloped, with bullet shaped geometries. These virions are about 75 nm wide and 180 nm long. Lyssavirions have helical symmetry, so their infectious particles are approximately cylindrical in shape. Virions of human-infecting viruses more commonly have cubic symmetry and take shapes approximating regular polyhedra.

The structure consists of a spiked outer envelope, a middle region consisting of matrix protein M, and an inner ribonucleocapsid complex region, consisting of the genome associated with other proteins.

=== Genome ===
Lyssavirus genomes consist of a negative-sense, single-stranded RNA molecule that encodes five viral proteins: polymerase L, matrix protein M, phosphoprotein P, nucleoprotein N, and glycoprotein G. Genomes are linear, around 11 kb in length.

Based on recent phylogenetic evidence, lyssaviruses have been categorized into seven major species. In addition, five more species have recently been discovered: West Caucasian bat virus, Aravan virus, Khujand virus, Irkut virus and Shimoni bat virus. The lyssavirus genus can be divided into four phylogroups based upon DNA sequence homology. Phylogroup I includes viruses, such as Rabies virus, Duvenhage virus, European bat lyssavirus types 1 and 2, Australian bat lyssavirus, Khujand virus, Bokeloh bat lyssavirus, Irkut virus, and Aravan virus. Phylogroup II contains Lagos bat virus, Mokola virus, and Shimoni bat virus. West Caucasian bat lyssavirus is the only virus that is a part of phylogroup III. Ikoma lyssavirus and Lleida bat lyssavirus are examples in phylogroup IV. West Caucasian bat lyssavirus was classified within its own phylogroup because it is the most divergent lyssavirus that has been discovered.

Genus	Structure	Symmetry	Capsid	Genomic arrangement	Genomic segmentation
Lyssavirus	Bullet-shaped		Enveloped	Linear	Monopartite

=== Evolution ===
Phylogenetic studies suggest that the original hosts of these viruses were bats. However, the recent discovery of lyssavirus sequences from amphibians and reptiles challenges the mammalian origin of lyssaviruses. The greater antigenic diversity of lyssaviruses from Africa has led to the assumption that Africa was the origin of these viruses. An examination of 153 viruses collected between 1956 and 2015 from various geographic locations has instead suggested a Palearctic origin (85% likelihood) for these viruses. Date estimates (95% likelihood) for the most recent common ancestor were very broad – between 3,995 and 166,820 years before present – which suggests there is further work to be done in this area. Although bats evolved in the Palearctic, their origins antedate that of the lyssaviruses by millions of years, which argues against their co-speciation. The evolution rate in the N gene in the Africa 2 lineage has been estimated to be 3.75×10^{−3} substitutions per site per year. This rate is similar to that of other RNA viruses.

== Life cycle ==
Viral replication is cytoplasmic. Entry into the host cell is achieved by attachment of the viral G glycoproteins to host receptors, which mediates clathrin-mediated endocytosis. Replication follows the negative stranded RNA virus replication model. Negative stranded RNA virus transcription, using polymerase stuttering, is the method of transcription. The virus exits the host cell by budding and by tubule-guided viral movement. Wild mammals, especially bats and certain carnivores, serve as natural hosts. Transmission routes are typically via bite wounds.

Genus	Host details	Tissue tropism	Entry details	Release details	Replication site	Assembly site	Transmission
Lyssavirus	bats, Crocidura shrews and certain carnivores	Neurons	Clathrin-mediated endocytosis	Budding	Cytoplasm	Cytoplasm	Bite wounds

== Testing ==
As of 2018 the direct fluorescent antibody (DFA) test is still the gold standard to detect lyssavirus infection. Since the new millennium reverse transcription PCR (RT-PCR) tests have been developed for rabies but only been used as a confirmatory test. Real-time PCR-based tests which have higher sensitivity and objective diagnostic thresholds and allow samples to be stored at room temperature have been promising since 2005, but require a real-time PCR machine and skilled workers with experience in molecular diagnostics. In an international evaluation a single TaqMan LN34 assay could detect Lyssavirus with high sensitivity (99.90%) across the genus and high specificity (99.68%) when compared to the DFA test. It will become the primary post-mortem rabies diagnostic test where possible.

== Epidemiology ==
Classic rabies virus is prevalent throughout most of the world and can be carried by any warm blooded mammal. The other lyssaviruses have much less diversity in carriers. Only select hosts can carry each of these viral species. Also, these other species are particular only to a specific geographic area. Bats are known to be an animal vector for all identified lyssaviruses except the Mokola virus.

== See also ==
- Bat-borne virus
