= Duvenhage virus =

Virus classification
- (unranked): Virus
- Realm: Riboviria
- Kingdom: Orthornavirae
- Phylum: Negarnaviricota
- Class: Monjiviricetes
- Order: Mononegavirales
- Family: Rhabdoviridae
- Genus: Lyssavirus
- Species: Lyssavirus duvenhage

Synonyms
- Duvenhage lyssavirus; Duvenhage virus

Species of virus

Duvenhage virus (DUVV) is a member of the genus Lyssavirus, which also contains the rabies virus. The virus was discovered in 1970, when a South African farmer (after whom the virus is named) died of a rabies-like encephalitic illness, after being bitten by a bat. In 2006, Duvenhage virus killed a second person, when a man was scratched by a bat in North West Province, South Africa, 80 km from the 1970 infection. He developed a rabies-like illness 27 days after the bat encounter, and died 14 days after the onset of illness. A 34-year-old woman who died in Amsterdam on December 8, 2007, was the third recorded fatality. She had been scratched on the nose by a small bat while travelling through Kenya in October 2007, and was admitted to hospital four weeks later with rabies-like symptoms.

Microbats are believed to be the natural reservoir of Duvenhage virus. It has been isolated twice from insectivorous bats, in 1981 from Miniopterus schreibersi, and in 1986 from Nycteris thebaica, and the virus is closely related to another bat-associated lyssavirus endemic to Africa, Lagos bat virus.
