= European bat lyssavirus 2 =

Virus classification
- (unranked): Virus
- Realm: Riboviria
- Kingdom: Orthornavirae
- Phylum: Negarnaviricota
- Class: Monjiviricetes
- Order: Mononegavirales
- Family: Rhabdoviridae
- Genus: Lyssavirus
- Species: Lyssavirus helsinki

Species of virus

European bat lyssavirus 2 (EBLV-2) is one of three rabies-like viruses of the genus Lyssavirus found in Daubenton's bats (Myotis daubentonii) in Great Britain. Human fatalities have occurred: the naturalist David McRae, who was bitten by a Daubenton's bat in Scotland, became infected with EBLV-2a and died in November 2002. It must now be assumed that the virus is present in bats in the UK. Testing of dead bats by MAFF/DEFRA over the last decade indicates that the overall incidence of infection is likely to be very low, although limited testing of live Daubenton's bats for antibodies suggests that exposure to EBLV-2 may be more widespread.

Nevertheless, infected bat bites have caused human deaths so appropriate precautions against infection must be taken. The Department of Health’s recommendation is that people regularly handling bats should be vaccinated against rabies. Included in this category are all active bat workers and wardens, and those regularly taking in sick and injured bats. The Statutory Nature Conservation Organisations and the Bat Conservation Trust urge all those involved in bat work to ensure that they are fully vaccinated and that they receive regular boosters. Bats should not be handled by anyone who has not received these vaccinations. Even when fully vaccinated, people should avoid being bitten by wearing appropriate bite-proof gloves when handling bats. Any bat bite should be thoroughly cleansed with soap and water, and advice should be sought from a doctor about the need for post-exposure treatment. Further information is available from the SNCOs, the Bat Conservation Trust or the Health Protection Agency (HPA) or Scottish Centre for Infection and Environmental Health (SCIEH).

== See also ==
- Australian bat lyssavirus
- European bat lyssavirus 1
