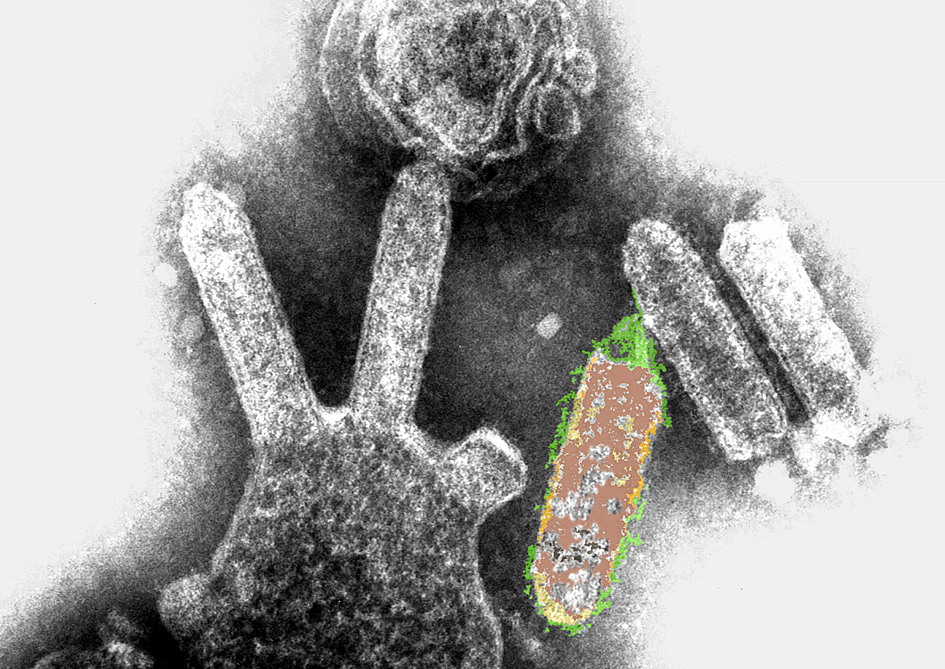
- Colored transmission electron micrograph of Australian bat lyssavirus. The bullet-like objects are the virions, and some of them are budding off from a cell.

Virus classification
- (unranked): Virus
- Realm: Riboviria
- Kingdom: Orthornavirae
- Phylum: Negarnaviricota
- Class: Monjiviricetes
- Order: Mononegavirales
- Family: Rhabdoviridae
- Genus: Lyssavirus
- Species: Lyssavirus australis

Synonyms
- Pteropid lyssavirus

= Australian bat lyssavirus =

Species of virus

Australian bat lyssavirus (ABLV) is an enzootic virus closely related to the rabies virus. It was first identified in a 5-month-old juvenile black flying fox (Pteropus alecto) collected near Ballina in northern New South Wales, Australia, in January 1995 during a national surveillance program for the recently identified Hendra virus. ABLV is the seventh member of the genus Lyssavirus (which includes rabies virus) and the only Lyssavirus member present in Australia. ABLV has been categorised to the Phylogroup I of the Lyssaviruses.

== Virology ==
=== Molecular structure ===
The Australian bat lyssavirus (ABLV) shares many structural characteristics with the other Lyssaviruses, despite being genetically and serologically distinct from the others. Visually, ABLV is a bullet shaped virus. Molecularly, ABLV is an enveloped, negative-sense, single-stranded RNA virus. The (-)ssRNA genome is relatively small, containing 12 kilobases of genetic material and encoding five viral proteins. The five viral proteins, their symbol, and their functional roles are:

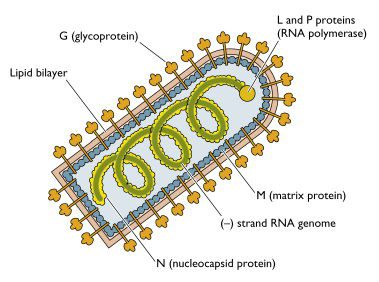
Viral structure of a lyssavirus particle with the five viral proteins and genome labelled

| Symbol | Name | Structure | Function |
|---|---|---|---|
| N | Nucleoprotein | Interacts with genome, P, and L to form the ribonucleoprotein complex | Encapsulates the RNA genome, making it available for transcription and genome replication |
| P | Phosphoprotein | Cofactor for L | Regulatory functions for viral replication Helps virus evade host immune system - suppressing host immunity |
| M | Matrix | Physically connecting the viral capsid to the host derived membrane Interacts with P and L | Aids in viral assembly, coordinates translation and genome replication, and directs budding |
| G | Glycoprotein | Trimeric surface protein spikes, associated with M and extends through the host cell derived membrane envelope | Utilised for host cell entry with receptor-mediated endocytosis |
| L | RNA-dependent RNA polymerase | | Enzyme for transcription (produce mRNA from genome) and viral genome replication |

=== Viral entry mechanism and intracellular trafficking ===
ABLV has a similar entry mechanism to other rabies viruses, utilizing receptor-mediated endocytosis by the host cells. The glycoprotein (G) is a trimeric spike protein that extends through the virus's envelope and can interact with surface receptors of host cells. While the specific receptors remain mostly unknown at this time, it is thought that ABLV enters the nervous system of host through the neuromuscular junction of the peripheral nervous system. Additionally, it is believed that the spike protein either binds to a highly specific host receptor or uses a co-receptor in lipid rafts. Some of the proposed receptors include nicotinic acetylcholine receptor (nAchR), p75 neurotrophin receptor (p75NTR), and neuronal cell adhesion molecule (NCAM).

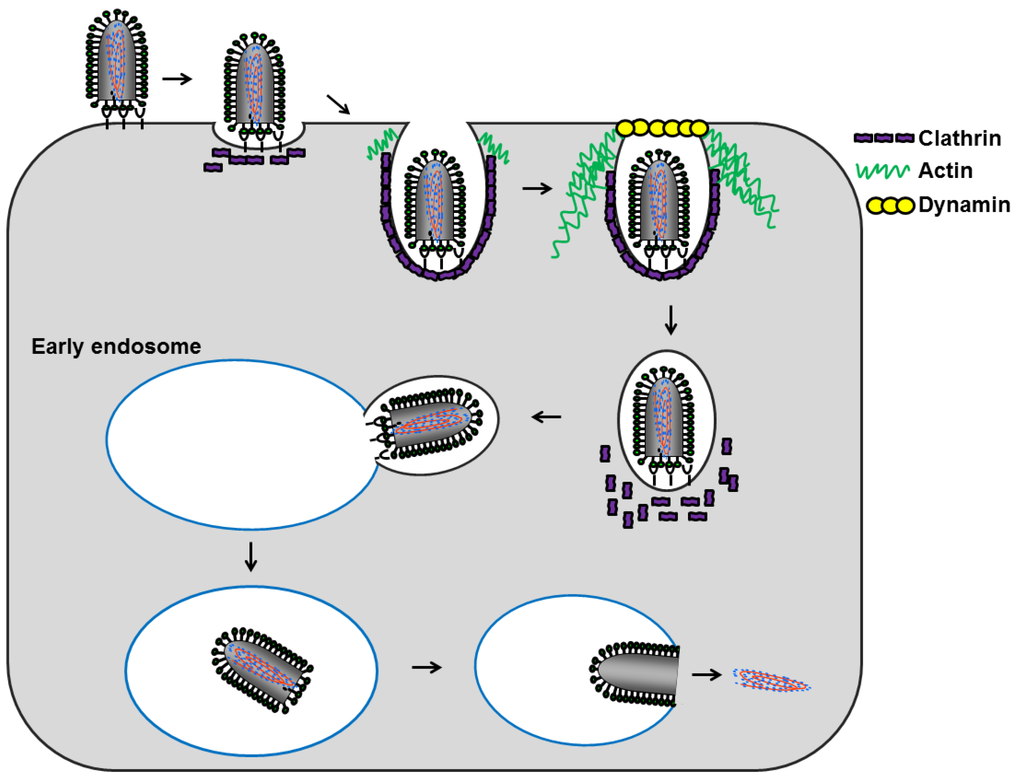
Viral entry pathway of lyssavirus

After attaching to the host cell surface, ABLV uses a clathrin-dynamin-dependent pathway to invaginate the host membrane and pinch off a vesicle. Actin polymerization at the site of invagination is also required for successful viral entry. The virus is endocytosed fully, unenveloped. The vesicle fuses with a lysosome, causing the pH within the infected vesicle to drop. The lowering of pH in the early-endosome causes a conformational change in the spike protein G. This allows the viral envelope to fuse with the endosome, releasing the nucleocapsid into the cytoplasm of the host cell.

== Prevalence ==
=== Host reservoir and susceptible species ===
Bats, both flying foxes and insectivorous bats, are the only known host reservoir for ABLV. The known species of bat reservoirs are the black flying fox (Pteropus alecto), the grey-headed flying fox (P. poliocephalus), the spectacled flying fox (P. conscpicullatus), the little red flying fox (P. scapulatus), and the Yellow-bellied Sheathtail Bat (Saccolaimus flaviventris). These species are distributed throughout the Australian continent, and ABLV has only been serologically and phylogenetically in Australia. It is estimated that less than 1% of healthy bats are ABLV carriers. As for sick or injured bats, it is estimated that 5–10% have been infected, detected with fluorescent antibody testing.

As for other species that are susceptible to ABLV infection, cases have been reported in humans since 1996 and in horses since 2013. No other terrestrial animals have been reported to be infected with ABLV, despite known exposure to infected bats. However, recent studies have found that the ABLV receptor for host cell entry is conserved amongst a variety of mammals, including but not limited to small rodents, monkeys, and rabbits.

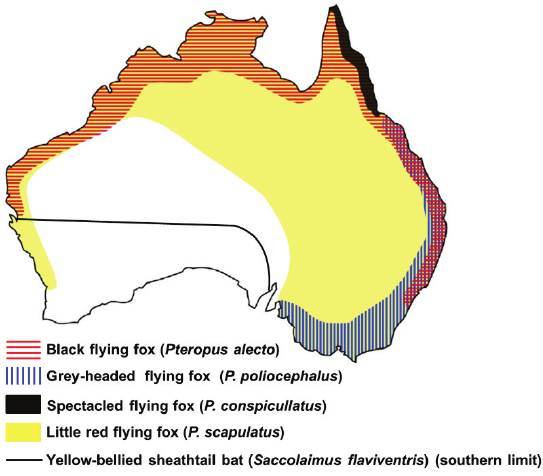
Distribution of ABLV based on the known reservoir hosts

=== Geographical distribution ===
As of now, ABLV has only been isolated and reported in Australia. The distribution of ABLV across the Australian continent is based on the ecological distribution of the bat reservoirs. From the four flying fox species identified as host reservoirs, ABLV is present in areas of Western Australia, the Northern Territory, Queensland, New South Wales, and Victoria. From the Yellow-bellied Sheathtail Bat, ABLV is present throughout mainland Australia.

== Human health ==
=== Zoonotic incidences ===
The first case occurred in November 1996, when 39-year-old Patricia Padget, an animal caregiver in Rockhampton, sustained several scratches from a bite from a yellow-bellied sheath-tailed bat in her care. She reported to the hospital four to five weeks later for shoulder pain, dizziness, vomiting, headache, fever, and chills. While hospitalised, her condition rapidly deteriorated, with slurred speech, diplopia (double-vision), dysphagia (difficulty swallowing), and progressive weakness in her limbs. From cerebrospinal fluid samples, no organisms were found with microscopy or culturing, despite elevated white blood cell levels. She was treated with several broad spectrum antibiotics with no improvement. An electroencephalogram was performed and found diffuse encephalitis. She eventually fell into a depressed conscious state, with a single incidence of extreme agitation. By her 11th day of hospitalization, she was fully ventilation dependent, nonresponsive, and hyperthermic. She died 20 days after her initial admittance. ABLV was identified from brain tissue by polymerase chain reaction and immunohistochemistry.

The second case began in August 1996; 37-year-old Monique Todhunter from Mackay was bitten on the finger by a flying fox at a birthday party while attempting to remove it from a child on whom it had landed. Six months later, following heightened public attention from the first ABLV death, she consulted a general practitioner regarding testing for the virus. Post-exposure prophylaxis was advised, but for an unknown reason she declined the treatment. After a 27-month incubation, a rabies-like illness developed in November 1998. She came in with symptoms of fever, vomiting, shoulder pain, dysphagia, and muscle spasms. Her condition worsened after hospital admission, as her dysphagia increased, her muscle spasms became more pronounced and frequent, and she became increasingly agitated. She became ventilation-dependent and unable to communicate due to full paralysis. On the day the woman was hospitalised, cerebrospinal fluid, serum, and saliva were submitted for testing. On the fourth day of her hospital admission, these tests were returned with results of probable ABLV infection. ABLV infection was confirmed by PCR on the 8th day of hospitalization. She died 19 days after the onset of illness in Mackay. Postmortem tests were all strongly positive for ABLV. A notable feature of this case is that the patient underwent a 27-month incubation period; in comparison, the majority of rabies cases have an incubation period of 20–90 days, with 95% of cases exhibiting symptoms within a year of exposure to the virus.

The third case occurred in December 2012, when 8-year-old Lincoln Flynn was scratched by a bat in Long Island. He became ill eight weeks later, showing symptoms including fever, anorexia, and abdominal pain. His condition worsened through his hospitalization, with abnormal and aggressive bouts between normal behavior and intense muscle spasms. He repeatedly needed to be extubated and sedated due to his spasms. The hospital performed several tests through his stay, including sending cerebrospinal fluid and blood samples off for testing, taking computed tomography images of his chest and abdomen, and performing neuroimaging (MRI, electroencephalography). Initially, tests for the ABLV antigens were negative, but repeated testing 12 days into his hospitalization provided positive results. The child died 28 days after the onset of symptoms on 22 February 2013 in Brisbane.

The fourth case was reported by the NSW Health department on 2 July 2025. In northern New South Wales, a man in his 50s was in critical condition with ABLV after being bitten by a bat several months earlier. The man had received treatment for the bat bite following the incident. The man died on 3 July.

=== Pathology and pathogenesis of ABLV in humans ===
ABLV (and the other Lyssaviruses) present similarly to the traditional encephalitic rabies virus (RABV) in humans. The symptoms first are flu-like with fevers, headaches, and fatigue. The symptoms progress with paralysis, delirium, convulsions, and death. There are no known human survivors of ABLV infection after symptoms have manifested.

The pathogenesis of ABLV is still widely unknown and still being studied. The virus initially infects the host through the peripheral nervous system following a bite or scratch from an infected animal.

For the four reported ABLV cases in humans, the incubation period ranged from a few weeks to more than two years.

=== Current treatments for ABLV ===
Due to its difficulty in diagnosing, low number of reported cases, and relative novelty as an endemic virus, there are no successful treatment plans once the symptoms have begun. Intervention methods used on all four human cases of ABLV were not curative and all four cases resulted in fatality.

However, it is highly recommended by physicians to receive the RABV post-exposure prophylaxis (PEP) protocol immediately after potential lyssavirus exposure (i.e. exposure/interaction with bats). Additionally, the incident should be reported to the relevant public health unit. Currently, the PEP protocol involves thoroughly cleaning the wound and surrounding tissue, administration of the rabies vaccine, and administration of rabies immunoglobulin (RIG). Currently, there are two effective variations of RIGs used in PEP protocol, human RIG (HRIG) and equine RIG (ERIG). Drawbacks for HRIG are that there are limited supplies and the cost of production is high. HRIG is overall inaccessible for the general population. Drawbacks for ERIG are potential immunogenicity, which is when the immune system recognises the RIG as foreign and causes an immune reaction. In a 2021 study performed by Weir, Coggins, et.al., a new treatment method was proposed that used human monoclonal antibodies over RIGs. They identified two (A6 and F11) that recognised the G protein of lyssaviruses in phylogroup I (including ABLV) and completely neutralised the virus. They also proposed it as a potential diagnostic tool, in which there are only limited methods with PCR and are late into the symptomatic phase to positively identify ABLV.

=== Prevention ===
Rabies vaccine and immunoglobulin are effective in prophylactic and therapeutic protection from ABLV infection. Since the emergence of the virus, rabies vaccine is administered to individuals with a heightened risk of exposure, and vaccine and immunoglobulin are provided for post-exposure treatment.

The public health units in Australia advise that the population avoid and limit their interactions and physical contact with bats as much as possible. ABLV is one of four zoonotic viruses discovered in pteropid bats since 1994, the others being Hendra virus, Nipah virus, and Menangle virus. Of these, ABLV is the only virus known to be transmissible to humans directly from bats without an intermediate host. Thus education and awareness in the general population is a must. If a bat is found and/or appears injured, one should avoid contact with it and instead call local pest and animal control to appropriately remove the bat.

== Non-human health ==
ABLV has also been reported to have the ability to transfer to horses. Currently, this is the only other known susceptible species.

ABLV was confirmed in two horses on Queensland's Darling Downs in May 2013. Both horses were euthanised when their condition deteriorated despite treatment and the attending veterinarian performed a post mortem examination obtaining samples that allowed for the laboratory diagnosis. The property was then quarantined. Three dogs and the four horses in closest contact received post exposure prophylaxis, as did all nine in-contact people. The virus was isolated and identified as the insectivorous bat strain. These cases have prompted reconsideration of the potential spillover of ABLV into domestic animal species. Veterinarians are urged to consider ABLV as a differential diagnosis in cases of progressive generalised neurological disease.

== See also ==
- European bat lyssavirus 1

== Additional reading ==
- Samaratunga H, Searle JW, Hudson N (August 1998). "Non-rabies Lyssavirus human encephalitis from fruit bats: Australian bat Lyssavirus (pteropid Lyssavirus) infection". Neuropathology and Applied Neurobiology. 24 (4): 331–335. doi:10.1046/j.1365-2990.1998.00129.x. PMID 9775399.
- Fraser GC, Hooper PT, Lunt RA, Gould AR, Gleeson LJ, Hyatt AD, et al. (1996). "Encephalitis caused by a Lyssavirus in fruit bats in Australia". Emerging Infectious Diseases. 2 (4): 327–331. doi:10.3201/eid0204.960408. PMC 2639915. PMID 8969249.
- Annand EJ, Reid PA (September 2014). "Clinical review of two fatal equine cases of infection with the insectivorous bat strain of Australian bat lyssavirus". Australian Veterinary Journal. 92 (9): 324–332. doi:10.1111/avj.12227. PMID 25156050.
