= Bokeloh bat lyssavirus =

Bokelok bat lyssavirus

Virus classification
- (unranked): Virus
- Realm: Riboviria
- Kingdom: Orthornavirae
- Phylum: Negarnaviricota
- Class: Monjiviricetes
- Order: Mononegavirales
- Family: Rhabdoviridae
- Genus: Lyssavirus
- Species: Lyssavirus bokeloh

Species of virus

Bokeloh bat lyssavirus (BBLV) is negative-sense, single-stranded RNA virus of the genus Lyssavirus first isolated from a Natterer's bat (Myotis nattereri) found in Bokeloh, Lower Saxony, Germany in 2010.
