= European bat lyssavirus 1 =

Virus classification
- (unranked): Virus
- Realm: Riboviria
- Kingdom: Orthornavirae
- Phylum: Negarnaviricota
- Class: Monjiviricetes
- Order: Mononegavirales
- Family: Rhabdoviridae
- Genus: Lyssavirus
- Species: Lyssavirus hamburg

Species of virus

European bat lyssavirus 1 (EBLV-1) is one of three rabies-like viruses of the genus Lyssavirus found in serotine bats (Eptesicus serotinus) in Spain. Strains of EBLV-1 have been identified as EBLV-1a and EBLV-1b. EBLV-1a was isolated from bats found in the Netherlands and Russia, while EBLV-1b was found in bats in France, the Netherlands and Iberia. E. isabellinus bats are the EBLV-1b reservoir in the Iberian Peninsula. Between 1977 and 2010, 959 bat rabies cases of EBLV-1 were reported to the World Health Organization (WHO) Rabies Bulletin.

== See also ==
- Australian bat lyssavirus
- European bat lyssavirus 2
