= Rabies immunoglobulin =

Medication made up of antibodies against the rabies virus

Clinical data
- Trade names: Imogam Rabies-HT, Kedrab, Hyperrab, others
- AHFS/Drugs.com: Monograph
- Pregnancy category: AU: B2
- Routes of administration: Intramuscular injection
- ATC code: J06BB05 (WHO)

Legal status
- Legal status: AU: S4 (Prescription only); CA: ℞-only / Schedule D; US: ℞-only

Identifiers
- DrugBank: DB11603
- ChemSpider: none
- UNII: 95F619ATQ2

Rabies immunoglobulin (RIG) is a medication made up of antibodies against the rabies virus. It is used to prevent rabies following exposure. It is given after the wound is cleaned with soap and water or povidone-iodine and is followed by a course of rabies vaccine. It is given by injection into the site of the wound and into a muscle. It is not needed in people who have been previously vaccinated against rabies.

Rabies, a viral zoonotic neglected tropical disease, poses a severe public health threat in over 150 countries and territories, primarily in Asia and Africa. Each year, this disease results in tens of thousands of fatalities, with children under 15 accounting for 40% of these deaths. Rabies infects mammals and is spread to humans and other animals by contact with saliva, most commonly through bites and scratches. Worldwide, nearly all human rabies cases are caused by dog bites and scratches. However, in the United States, bats are now the primary source of human rabies due to the diligent vaccination of dogs against rabies.

Common side effects include pain at the site of injection, fever, and headache. Severe allergic reactions such as anaphylaxis may rarely occur. Use during pregnancy is not known to harm the fetus. It works by binding to the rabies virus before it can enter nerve tissue. After the virus has entered the central nervous system, rabies immunoglobulin is no longer useful.

The use of rabies immunoglobulin in the form of blood serum dates from 1891. Use became common within medicine in the 1950s. It is on the World Health Organization's List of Essential Medicines. Rabies immunoglobulin is expensive and hard to come by in the developing world. In the United States it is estimated to be more than US$1,000.00 per dose, and around £600 in the United Kingdom. It is made by isolating rabies immunoglobulin from donated blood plasma of humans or horses who have high levels of the immunoglobulin. The equine preparation is less expensive but has a higher rate of side effects. As an alternative to HRIG (Human Rabies Immunoglobulin) and ERIG (Equine Rabies Immunoglobulin), anti-rabies monoclonal antibodies are used in some places, having been approved for use as an alternative to rabies immunoglobulin in China and in India since 2016.

== Medical uses ==
Rabies immunoglobulin (RIG) is indicated for the passive, transient post-exposure prophylaxis of rabies infection, when given immediately after contact with a rabid or possibly rabid animal and in combination with a rabies vaccine.

== Post-exposure prophylaxis (PEP) regimen ==
The administration of Rabies Immunoglobulin (RIG) as part of post-exposure prophylaxis (PEP) depends on whether the individual has been previously vaccinated against rabies. Regardless of immunization status, PEP should begin immediately with thorough wound cleansing using soap and water, or preferably, irrigation with a povidone-iodine solution to reduce the viral load.

== Exposure risk categories and PEP indications ==
According to the World Health Organization, PEP recommendations are based on the severity of exposure: Category I: Touching or feeding animals, or licks on intact skin — No PEP required, only washing of the exposed skin. Category II: Nibbling of uncovered skin, minor scratches, or abrasions without bleeding—Wound washing and immediate vaccination required. Category III: Transdermal bites, deep scratches, mucous membrane contamination with saliva, or any direct contact with bats—Wound washing, immediate vaccination, and administration of rabies immunoglobulin (RIG) or monoclonal antibodies required.

Some researchers propose an additional category, Category IV exposure, which would apply to the most severe form of exposure, namely to all severe bites to the face, head, and/or neck, with the treating clinician having discretion to also upgrade some other Category III exposures to Category IV, such as multiple bites and/or very severe bites elsewhere on the body.

== PEP for non-immunized individuals ==
For individuals who have never received rabies vaccination, PEP consists of both rabies vaccine and RIG. The rabies vaccine should be administered intramuscularly in the deltoid area on days 0, 3, 7, and 14. A fifth dose on day 28 is recommended for individuals with confirmed or suspected immune disorders. A full dose of rabies immunoglobulin (RIG) should be infiltrated around all identified wounds as much as anatomically possible, with any remaining volume administered intramuscularly at a site distant from the rabies vaccine injection.

== Mechanism of action ==
Rabies Immune Globulin (RIG) binds to the rabies virus, thereby neutralizing it and preventing its spread to the central nervous system. This provides short-term passive immunity, allowing time for the rabies vaccine to stimulate an adaptive immune response capable of eradicating the virus. RIG is only effective if administered within the first eight days post-exposure, as the host's immune system typically begins generating its own antibodies one week after exposure. Repeat doses should be avoided, as they may interfere with the body's natural immune response induced by the vaccine.

== PEP for previously immunized individuals ==
For individuals who have been previously vaccinated against rabies, RIG should not be administered. Instead, the rabies vaccine is given intramuscularly in the deltoid area on days 0 and 3.

== Society and culture ==
=== Names ===
There are three versions of rabies immunoglobulin licensed and available in the US. Imogam Rabies-HT is produced by Sanofi Pasteur. Kedrab is produced by Kedrion Biopharma. Hyperrab is produced by Grifols.

Imogam Rabies-HT and Kedrab have a nominal potency of 150 IU/mL while Hyperrab has a nominal potency of 300 IU/mL and requires smaller dosing. All three versions are used for post-exposure and indicate local infusion at the wound site with additional amount intramuscularly at a site distant from vaccine administration.

Kamrab is approved for medical use in Australia.

== Global access and one health ==
Rabies-endemic countries, particularly rural areas of Africa and Asia, have limited rabies immunoglobulin (RIG). The World Health Organization (WHO) estimates that less than 10 percent of people who require RIG after exposure actually receive it. Medical and veterinary intervention is important in human rabies prevention; therefore, a One Health approach that coordinates human, animal, and environmental sectors will help in RIG distribution and use. With the One Health approach, the primary reservoir species in most endemic areas, which is domestic dogs, is key in controlling preventable human infection.

== Equity and regional production ==
Several countries in Asia (including India, Thailand, and China) and in Latin America have developed local production capacity for purified equine RIG to reduce reliance on imported biologics. WHO and its partners encourage regional collaboration and technology transfer to strengthen manufacturing and quality assurance systems. Research into 'monoclonal antibody-based alternatives aims to improve global supply security and affordability, aligning with One Health principles of equitable access to life-saving biologics.
