= Lagos bat virus =

Virus classification
- (unranked): Virus
- Realm: Riboviria
- Kingdom: Orthornavirae
- Phylum: Negarnaviricota
- Class: Monjiviricetes
- Order: Mononegavirales
- Family: Rhabdoviridae
- Genus: Lyssavirus
- Species: Lyssavirus lagos

Synonyms
- Lagos bat lyssavirus

Species of virus

Lagos bat virus (LBV) is a Lyssavirus of southern and central Africa that causes a rabies-like illness in mammals. It was first isolated from a fruit bat (Eidolon helvum) from Lagos Island, Nigeria in 1956. Brain samples from the bat showed poor cross-reactivity to rabies antibodies but the virus was found to be closely related to the rabies virus. This was the first discovery of a rabies-related virus. Until this time, rabies was thought to have a single causal agent.

Lagos bat virus has been isolated from wild and domestic mammals in southern Africa including bats, cats and one dog. One isolate was detected in France in 1999 when a fruit bat (Rousettus egypticus), which had been displaying signs of aggression, died. The bat had been imported from Africa.
