= Rehlinger =

Rehlinger is a German surname. Notable people with the surname include:

- Anke Rehlinger (born 1976), German politician
- Ludwig A. Rehlinger (1927–2023), German jurist

== See also ==
- Ehlinger
- Remlinger
