= Remlinger =

Remlinger is a surname. Notable people with the surname include:

- Mike Remlinger (born 1966), American baseball player
- Paul Remlinger (1871–1964), French physician and biologist

== See also ==
- Remlingen (disambiguation)
- Remlinger Farms, Tourist attractions in King County, Washington
