= Anna Wessels Williams =

American bacteriologist

- Born: March 17, 1863; Hackensack, New Jersey
- Died: 1954 (aged 90–91); Westwood, New Jersey
- Education: Woman's Medical College of the New York Infirmary
- Occupation: pathologist
- Years active: 1891-1934

Anna Wessels Williams (1863–1954) was an American pathologist and public-health physician who worked at the first municipal diagnostic laboratory in the United States. She used her medical training from the Woman's Medical College of the New York Infirmary for research rather than clinical practice, and over the course of her career, she contributed to the development of vaccines, treatments and diagnostic tests for many diseases, including diphtheria, rabies, scarlet fever, smallpox, influenza, and meningitis. Notably, a strain of diphtheria-causing bacteria that Williams isolated and cultivated—later named Park-Williams No. 8—was instrumental in producing an antitoxin that helped bring the disease under control.

Williams also developed the standard diagnostic test for rabies, coauthored several widely used medical texts, and was among the first American women to make lasting contributions to laboratory medicine. In 1932, she became the first woman elected chair of the laboratory section of the American Public Health Association.

== Early life ==
Anna Wessels Williams was born in 1863 in Hackensack, New Jersey, to Jane Van Saun and William Williams, a private-school teacher. She was educated at home by her father and attended the State Street Public School, where her father served as a trustee. Williams developed a passion for science at a young age, particularly after using a microscope at age twelve. She graduated from New Jersey State Normal School in Trenton in 1883 and spent two years teaching to save money for medical school.

Her life took a significant turn in 1887 when her sister Millie nearly died while giving birth to a stillborn child. Anna believed that the attending physician's inadequate training contributed to the tragedy, which motivated her to resign from teaching and to pursue a career in medicine in hopes of preventing such outcomes. Although her religiously devout mother initially objected, Williams won her support by expressing an intention to apply medicine to missionary work.

Later that year, she enrolled in the Woman's Medical College of the New York Infirmary, where she studied under pioneers such as Elizabeth Blackwell and Mary Putnam Jacobi.

Reflecting on this decision, Williams later wrote:

"I was starting on a way that had been practically untrod before by any woman. My belief at the time in human individuality, regardless of sex, race, religion or any factor other than ability was at its strongest. I believed, therefore, that females should have equal opportunities with males to develop their powers to the utmost."

After graduating in 1891, Williams returned to her alma mater to teach pathology and hygiene. She worked in the children's clinic and "out-practice" before later pursuing further medical training in Europe, attending universities in Vienna, Heidelberg, Leipzig, and interning at the Royal Frauen Klinik of Leopold in Dresden.

== Research career ==
=== Diphtheria research ===
In 1894, Williams began volunteering at the New York City Department of Health's diagnostic laboratory, the first municipal laboratory in the United States. The lab had opened just a year earlier in response to a cholera outbreak. Her first publication came from studying bacteria found in a box of cheese sent to the lab.

Working closely with the laboratory's director, William H. Park, Williams participated in efforts to combat diphtheria, which had reached epidemic proportions among children. During her first year, she successfully isolated a strain of the diphtheria bacillus from mild tonsillar diphtheria that could be used to produce large quantities of the antitoxin. She immunized animals—including goats, sheep, dogs, and a cow—to prepare the antitoxin. This breakthrough significantly increased the supply of the antitoxin and reduced its cost, making it widely accessible and contributing to the control of this disease.

Within a year of her discovery, the antitoxin was being distributed free of charge to physicians in the United States and England to meet the growing demand. Williams was soon appointed to a full-time staff position as assistant bacteriologist in 1895.

Although Williams made the discovery while Park was away, the inherently collaborative nature of laboratory research led to the strain being named Park-Williams No. 8, in recognition of both scientists. Over time, the name was often shortened to Park 8 in informal usage. Williams, however, expressed no concern about sharing credit, stating, "I am happy to have the honor of having my name thus associated with Dr. Park."

=== Rabies research ===
In 1896, Williams traveled to the Pasteur Institute in Paris in hopes of finding a toxin for scarlet fever that could be used to develop an antitoxin, similar to her earlier work with diphtheria. Although she was unsuccessful in this pursuit, she became involved in rabies research, serving as an interpreter at the hydrophobia clinic. She returned to New York with a culture of the rabies virus and used it to develop small quantities of a rabies vaccine, sparking greater interest in vaccine research within the United States. By 1898, an effective vaccine suitable for large-scale manufacturing had been developed.

Because rabies had a long incubation period and was often diagnosed too late for the vaccine to help, Williams focused on improving diagnosis. By studying brain tissue from infected animals, she discovered the virus produced unique changes in brain cells before symptoms appeared. Although she delayed publishing, Italian physician Adelchi Negri published similar findings in 1904, and the diagnostic cells became known as Negri bodies.

In 1905, Williams published an improved method for preparing and staining brain tissue that could detect Negri bodies within minutes, a dramatic improvement over previous techniques requiring days. Her test became the standard method for rabies diagnosis until 1939. In recognition of her expertise, the American Public Health Association appointed Williams as chair of a new committee on standard methods for rabies diagnosis in 1907.

=== Later research and contributions ===
In 1905, Williams was promoted to assistant director of the Department of Health laboratory, where she had worked since 1894. She organized a mostly female staff and emphasized teamwork to increase productivity.

She worked with Dr. Emily Barringer on improving the diagnosis and treatment of venereal disease and collaborated with Dr. Sara Josephine Baker's Division of Child Hygiene to develop more accurate diagnostic methods for trachoma, correcting frequent misdiagnoses in poor urban children.

She also pursued work on streptococcal and pneumococcal infections, developing new diagnostic toxins and techniques. During the Spanish–American War, she attempted to create a pneumonia serum. Around the same time, she temporarily relocated to Saranac Lake to care for her ill brother, continuing research remotely.

During World War I, Williams directed a training program at New York University for laboratory workers serving in the United States and overseas medical facilities. She also conducted research on meningitis detection and served on the Influenza Commission during the deadly 1918 pandemic.

In addition to her laboratory research, Williams coauthored two influential books with William H. Park, with whom she maintained a long-standing professional collaboration following their joint work on the diphtheria antitoxin. In 1905, the pair published the widely used medical textbook Pathogenic Micro-organisms Including Bacteria and Protozoa: A Practical Manual for Students, Physicians and Health Officers, which became popularly known as 'Park and Williams' by readers. By 1939, the publication had gone through eleven editions. In 1929, Williams and Park published Who's Who Among the Microbes, one of the earliest biomedical reference books intended for a general audience.

Throughout her career, Williams received numerous honors and recognitions. In 1915, she was elected president of the Woman's Medical society of New York. During the 1920s, she conducted extensive studies on scarlet fever. Following the development of the Dick test by George and Gladys Dick to detect the disease, Williams surveyed hundreds of diagnosed cases to assess the effectiveness of antitoxin treatments. In 1931, she was elected to an office in the laboratory section of the American Public Health Association, and the next year, became the first woman appointed as chair of the section. In 1936, the New York Women's Medical Society honored her with a testimonial dinner for her contributions to public health. In her acceptance speech, Williams expressed gratitude to her colleagues, including many of the women who had built careers in bacteriology alongside her or under her mentorship at the Department of Health.

Despite widespread public support, Williams was forced to retire in 1934 due to New York City's mandatory retirement policy at the age of seventy. Mayor Fiorello La Guardia described her as "a scientist of international repute". Williams spent her later years living with her sister in Westwood, New Jersey, where she died in 1954 at the age of ninety.

== Publications ==
- Williams, Anna Wessels; Lowden, May Murray (1906). The etiology and diagnosis of hydrophobia.
- Park, William Hallock; Williams, Anna Wessels (1910). Pathogenic micro-organisms, including bacteria and Protozoa; a practical manual for students, physicians and health officers. Internet Archive. New York; Philadelphia, Lea & Febiger.
  - Park, William Hallock; Williams, Anna W. (1905). Pathogenic micro-organisms, including bacteria and Protozoa; a practical manual for students, physicians and health officers (2d ed., enl. and thoroughly rev. ed.). New York and: Lea brothers & co.
  - Park, William Hallock; Williams, Anna Wessels (1939). Pathogenic Microörganisms: A Practical Manual for Students, Physicians and Health Officers. Lea & Febiger.
- Park, William Hallock; Williams, Anna Wessels (1929). Who's who among the microbes. Internet Archive. New York, Century. Log-in required.
- Williams, Anna Wessels (1932). Streptococci in relation to man in health and disease. London : Baillière, Tindall & Cox; Baltimore : Williams & Wilkins.
- Williams, Anna Wessels (1935). Autobiography, Chapter 22. Cambridge, Massachusetts: Schlesinger Library, Radcliffe Institute for Advanced Study, Harvard University. pp. 27–30. "Courtesy of: 79-M182--81-M157, Carton 2, Harvard University, The Radcliffe Institute for Advanced Study, Schlesinger Library, Cambridge." Manuscript.
