= Negri body =

Positive indicator of rabies infection

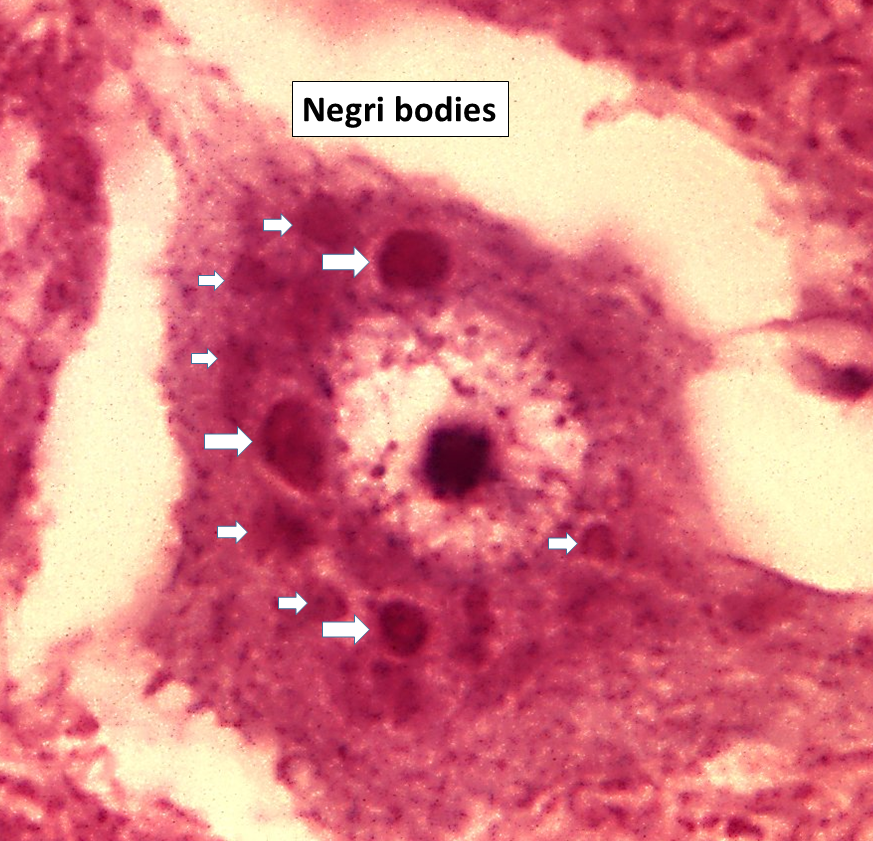
Histopathology of Negri bodies in rabies encephalitis.

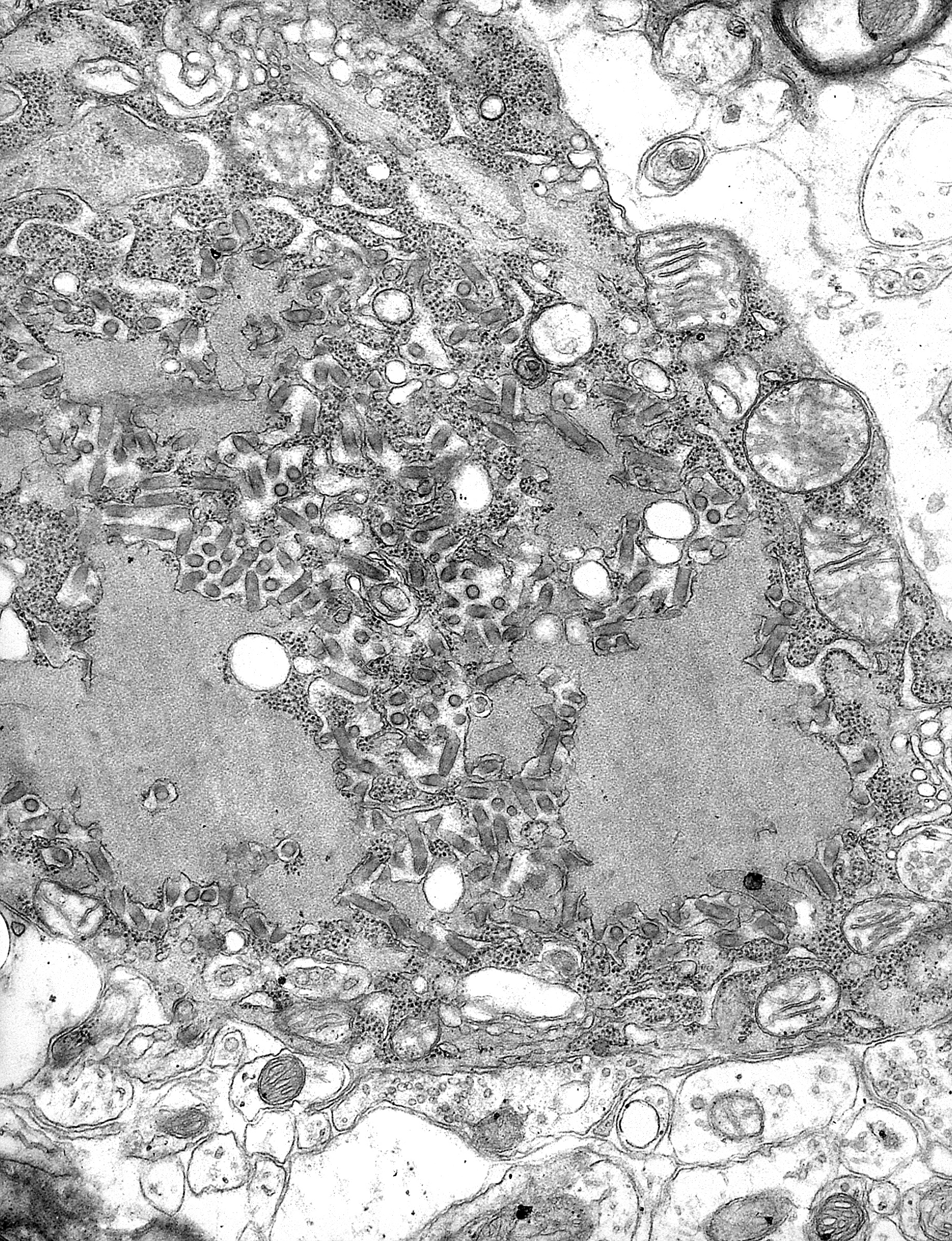
Micrograph with numerous rabies virions (small dark-grey rod-like particles) and Negri bodies, larger pathognomonic cellular inclusion bodies of rabies infection.

Negri bodies are eosinophilic, sharply outlined, pathognomonic inclusion bodies (2–10 μm in diameter) found in the cytoplasm of certain nerve cells containing the virus of rabies, especially in pyramidal cells within Ammon's horn of the hippocampus. They are also often found in the Purkinje cells of the cerebellar cortex from postmortem brain samples of rabies victims. They consist of ribonuclear proteins produced by the virus.

They are named for Adelchi Negri.

== History and significance ==
Adelchi Negri, an assistant pathologist working in the laboratory of Camillo Golgi, observed these inclusions in rabbits and dogs with rabies. These findings were presented in 1903 at a meeting of the Società Medico-Chirurgica of Pavia. The American pathologist Anna Wessels Williams made the same discovery, but because Negri published his results first, the bodies bear his name.

Negri was convinced the inclusions were a parasitic protozoon and the etiologic agent of rabies. Later that same year, however, Paul Remlinger and Rifat-Bey Frasheri in Constantinople and, separately, Alfonso di Vestea in Naples showed that the etiologic agent of rabies is a filterable virus. Negri continued until 1909 to try to prove that the intraneuronal inclusions named after him corresponded to steps in the developmental cycle of a protozoan.

In spite of his incorrect etiologic hypothesis, Negri's discovery represented a breakthrough in the rapid diagnosis of rabies, and the detection of Negri bodies, using a method developed by Anna Wessels Williams, remained the primary way to detect rabies for the next thirty years.
