= William Hallock Park =

American bacteriologist (1863–1939)

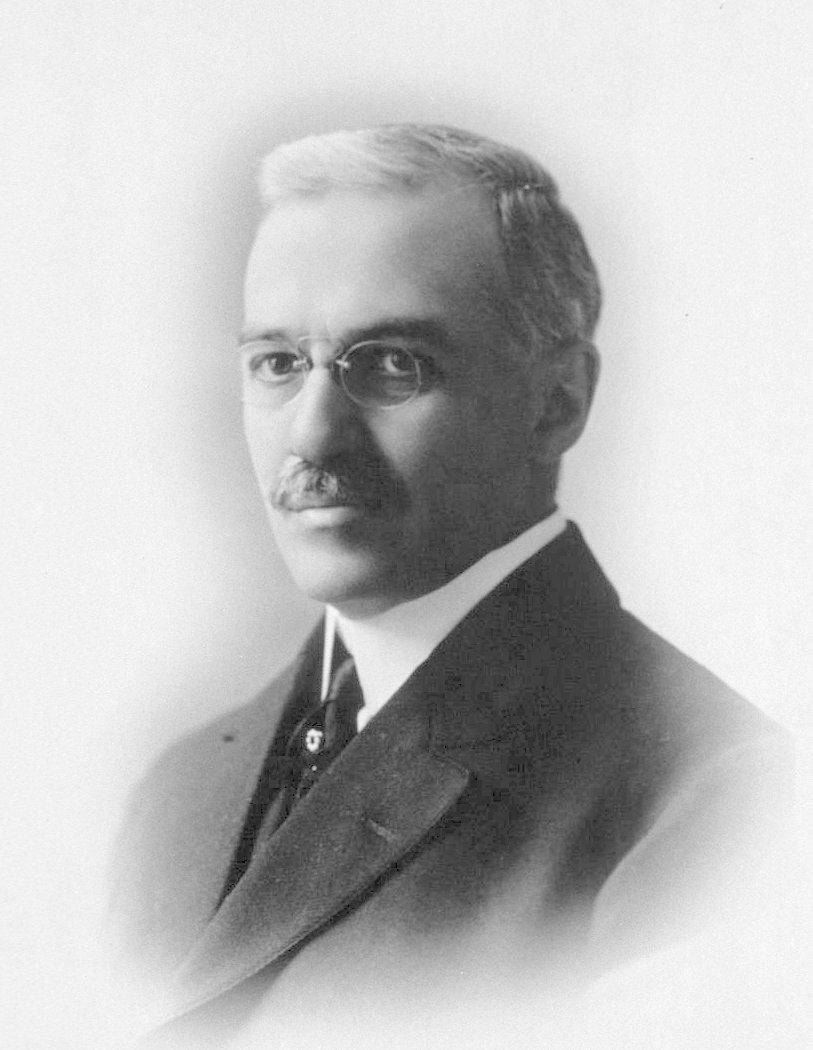
William Hallock Park

William Hallock Park (December 30, 1863 – April 6, 1939) was an American bacteriologist and laboratory director at the New York City Board of Health, Division of Pathology, Bacteriology, and Disinfection from 1893 to 1936.

== Biography ==
Park was born on December 30, 1863, in New York City.

In June 1883, he obtained a Bachelor of Arts degree from City College of New York and entered the Columbia University College of Physicians and Surgeons to study medicine. He studied pathology with Theophil Mitchell Prudden, planning to become a nose and throat specialist. After Park graduated in 1886, he interned at Roosevelt Hospital and had a year of post-graduate study in Vienna, Austria. On his return to the United States in 1890, Park worked on the bacteriology of diphtheria with Prudden.

In 1893, Hermann Biggs, Professor of Bacteriology at New York University and Chief Inspector of the New York City Board of Health, offered Park a director's position in the municipal laboratories to continue his work on diphtheria. In 1894, Biggs telegraphed Park with the news of the discovery of the diphtheria antitoxin by Emile Roux and Emil von Behring and instructed him to begin inoculating horses to produce antitoxin in New York City. The atypical strain of Corynebacterium diphtheriae most widely used for the production of diphtheria toxin was discovered by Anna Williams, who worked with Park.

Highlights of Park's career included the establishment of the first municipal bacteriological diagnostics laboratory in the United States, the application of toxin-antitoxin vaccines to prevent diphtheria, the demonstration of the persistence of Corynebacterium diphtheriae in the throats of people who recovered from diphtheria and its importance in the spread of the disease to others, and the publication of the widely used textbook Pathogenic Microorganisms, co-authored with Anna Williams.

In addition to his work on diphtheria for which he was best known, his scientific inquiries also included studies on scarlet fever, pneumonia, tuberculosis, whooping cough, meningitis, polio, measles, and the relationship and cause of milk and infantile diarrhea. In 1932 he was awarded the Public Welfare Medal from the National Academy of Sciences and the Sedgwick Medal from the American Public Health Association. The following year, he received the Townsend Harris Medal from City College given to alumni with outstanding achievements.

Although he did work on pathophysiology and immunity, his reputation in the field of microbiology was mainly for his contributions to public health and prevention of diseases.

Park retired as director of the research laboratories of the Public Health Department of New York City in September 1936. He died in New York City on April 6, 1939.
