= Adelchi Negri =

Italian microbiologist

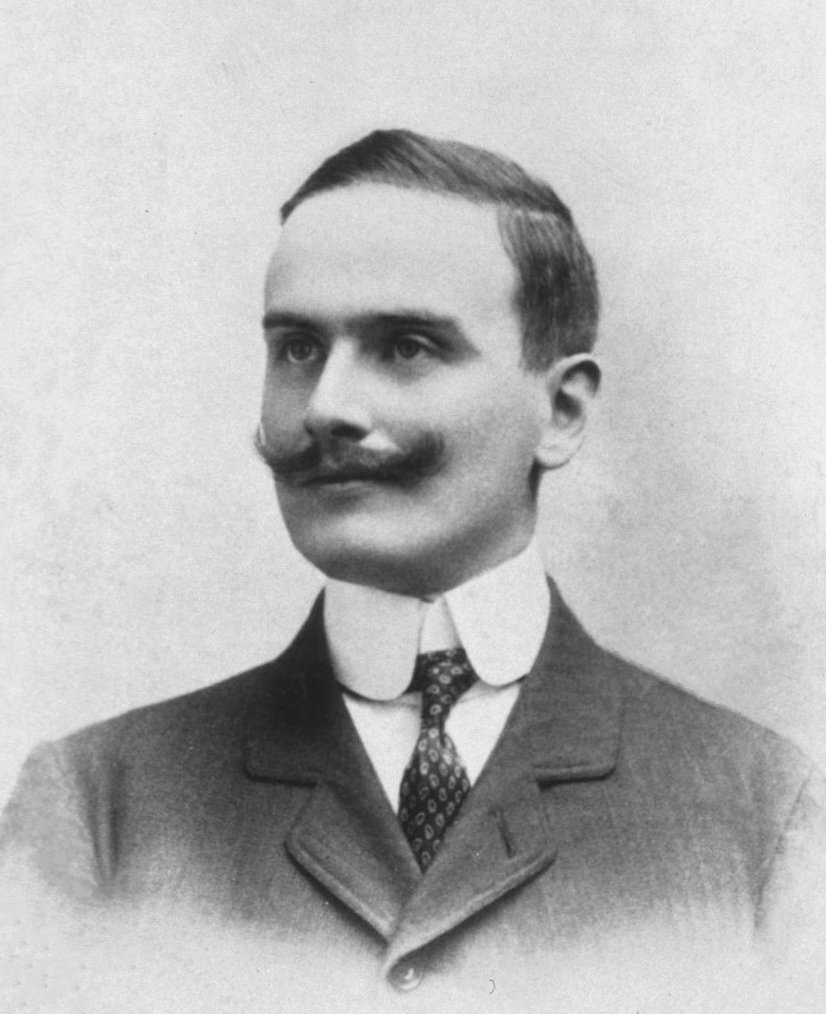
Adelchi Negri

Adelchi Negri (16 July 1876 – 19 February 1912) was an Italian pathologist and microbiologist born in Perugia.

He studied medicine and surgery at the University of Pavia, where he was a pupil of Camillo Golgi (1843–1926). After graduation in 1900, he became an assistant to Golgi at his pathological institute. In 1909 Negri became a professor of bacteriology, and the first official instructor of bacteriology in Pavia. On 19 February 1912 he died of tuberculosis at age 35.

Negri performed extensive research in the fields of histology, hematology, cytology, protozoology and hygiene. In 1903 he discovered the eponymous Negri bodies, defined as cytoplasmatic inclusion bodies located in the Purkinje cells of the cerebellum in cases of rabies in animals and humans. He documented his findings in an article titled Contributo allo studio dell'eziologia della rabbia, published in the journal Bollettino della Società medico-chirurgica. At the time, Negri mistakenly described the pathological agent of rabies as a parasitic protozoa. A few months later, Paul Remlinger (1871–1964) at the Constantinople Imperial Bacteriology Institute correctly demonstrated that the aetiological agent of rabies was not a protozoan, but a filterable virus.

Negri went on, however, to demonstrate in 1906 that the smallpox vaccine, then known as "vaccine virus", or "variola vaccinae", was also a filterable virus. During the latter part of his career, he became interested in malaria and was at the forefront in efforts to eradicate it from Lombardy. In 1906 he married his colleague Lina Luzzani and six years later, at the age of thirty-five, died of tuberculosis.

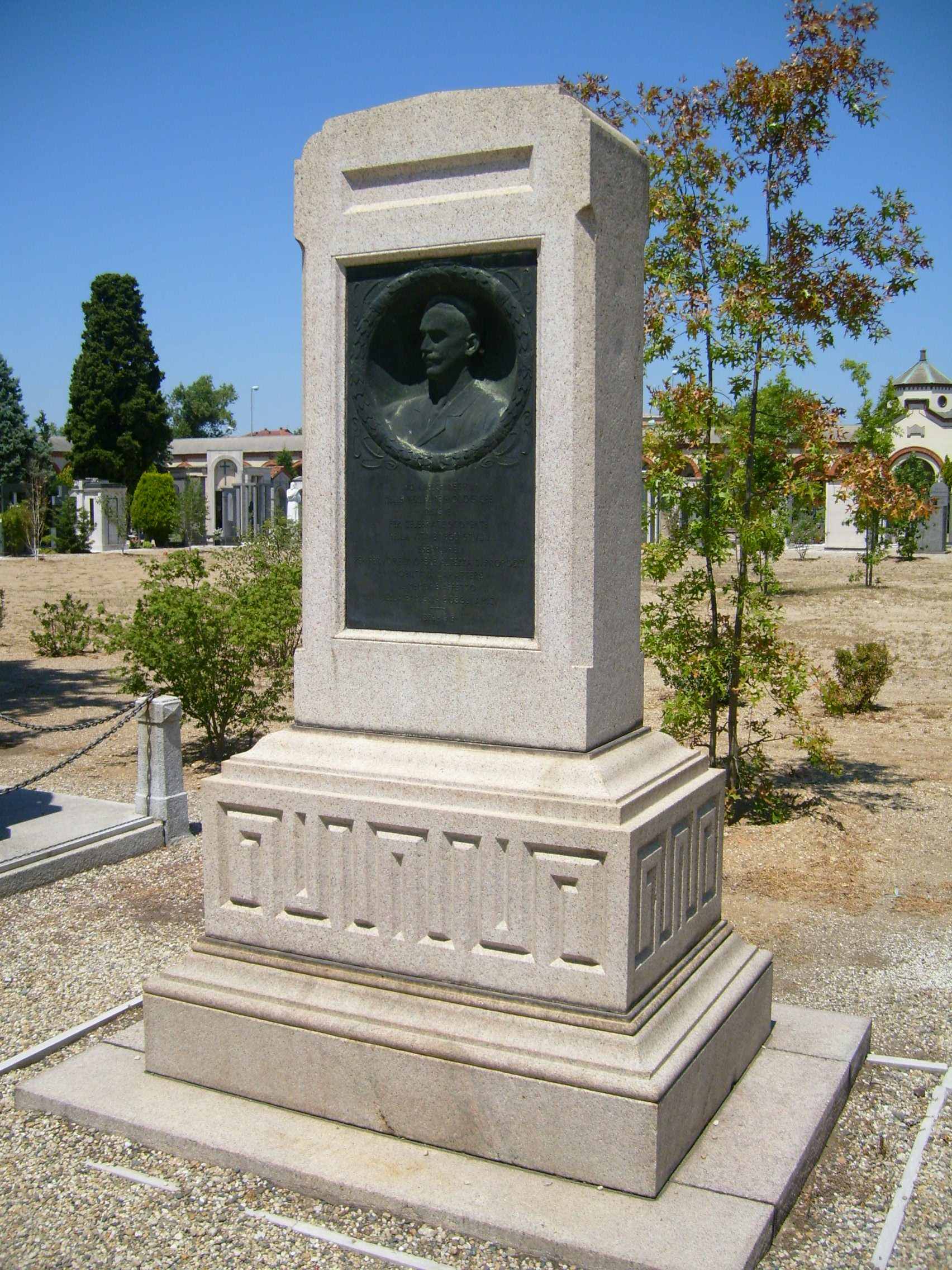
Negri's tomb in the Monumental Cemetery in Pavia

== Tomb ==
Negri was buried in the Monumental Cemetery of Pavia (Viale San Giovannino), along the central lane, on the left, near the tombs of other two important medical scientists, the anatomist Bartolomeo Panizza and his teacher, the Nobel Prize–winning Camillo Golgi.
