= Ehlinger =

Ehlinger is a surname. Notable people with the surname include:

- Aaron von Ehlinger (born 1987), American former politician and convicted rapist
- Ladd Ehlinger Jr. (born 1968), American filmmaker
- Maurice Ehlinger (1896–1981), French painter
- Nicolas Wagner Ehlinger (born 1992), Luxembourgian dressage rider
- Sam Ehlinger (born 1998), American football quarterback
