= Remlingen =

Remlingen may refer to the following places in Germany:

- Remlingen, Lower Saxony, in the district of Wolfenbüttel, Lower Saxony
- Remlingen, Bavaria, in the district of Würzburg, Bavaria
