= Paul Remlinger =

French physician and biologist (1871–1964)

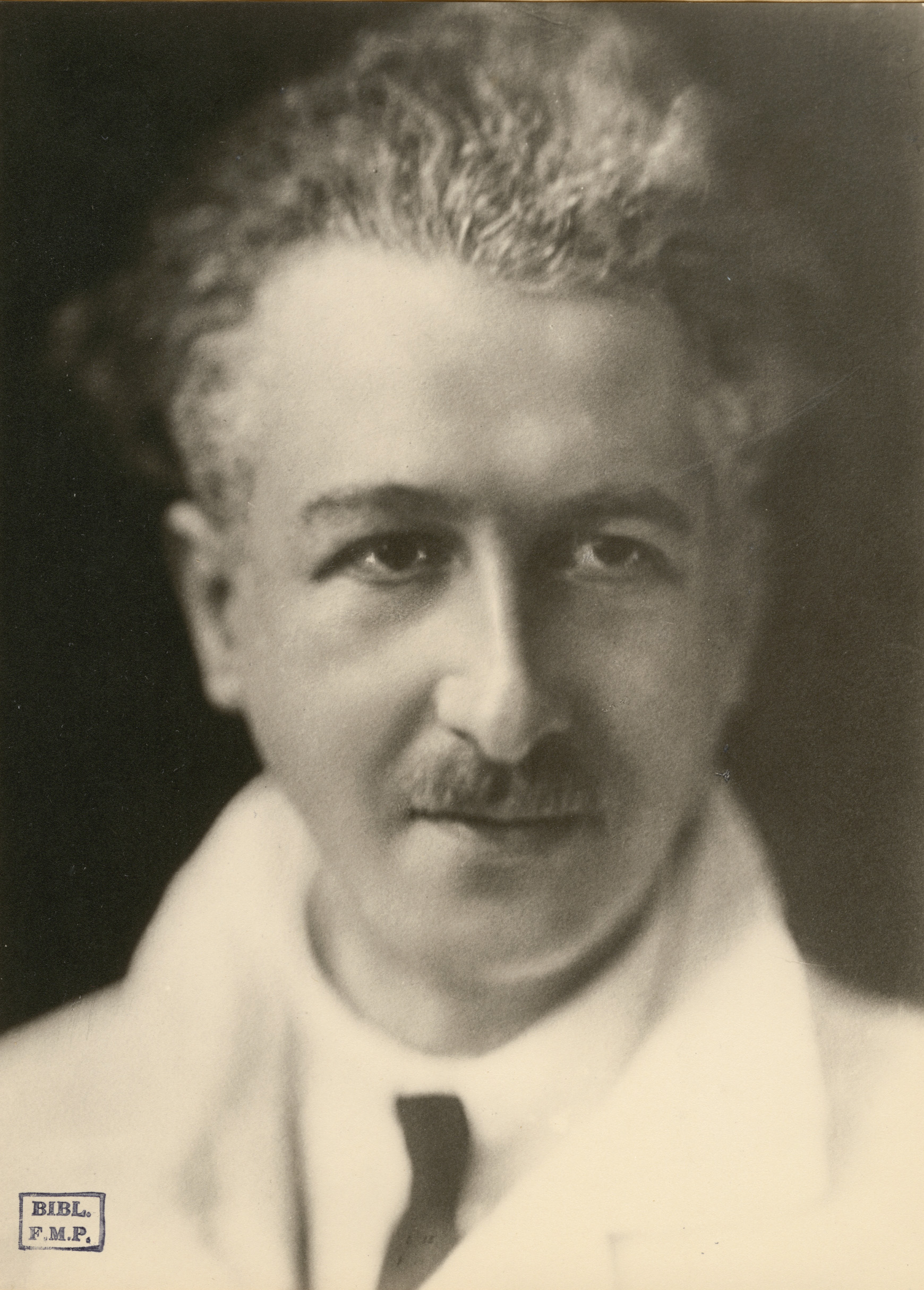

Paul Remlinger (29 December 1871 – 9 March 1964) was a French physician and biologist born in Bertrange, Moselle.

He studied medicine at the Val de Grâce military hospital, supporting his doctoral thesis in 1893 at the University of Lyon with a study on the heredity of tuberculosis. In 1896 he became head of the bacteriology laboratory in Tunis, followed by an assignment to the Constantinople Imperial Bacteriology Institute (1900). Soon afterwards he succeeded Maurice Nicolle (1862-1932) as director of the institute.

In 1914 he relocated to Tangier, where he served at the newly founded Pasteur Institute. He would be associated with the Tangier institute until his retirement in 1957. During World War I he worked as a doctor at Argonne, where he performed research of bacillary dysentery with Julien Dumas (1884-1965).

Remlinger was a leading authority on rabies and rabies vaccination. In 1903 he demonstrated that the causative agent of rabies was a filterable virus.

He was a corresponding member of the Société de biologie (1903), the Académie de Médecine (1919) and the Académie des Sciences (1944). He was a full member of the Société de pathologie exotique (1934), and a founding member of the International Society for Microbiology (1927).
