= The Great Influenza =

2004 non-fiction historical book by John M. Barry

The Great Influenza: The Story of the Deadliest Plague in History
- Author: John M. Barry
- Language: English
- Subject: Pandemics
- Published: New York, New York
- Publisher: Viking Press
- Publication date: 2004
- Publication place: USA
- Media type: print
- Pages: 546
- ISBN: 978-0670894734
- OCLC: 271407049

The Great Influenza: The Story of the Deadliest Plague in History (originally subtitled The Epic Story of the Deadliest Pandemic in History) is a 2004 nonfiction book by John M. Barry that examines the Spanish flu, a 1918-1920 flu pandemic and one of the worst pandemics in history. Barry focuses on what was occurring in the United States at the time and attempts to place it against the background of American history and within the context of the history of medicine. The book describes how the flu started in Haskell County, Kansas, USA, and spread to the U.S. Army training camp Camp Funston, Kansas, USA, and around the world through troop movements during World War I.

== Background Information ==
The 1918 influenza pandemic has been declared, according to Barry's text, as the 'deadliest plague in history'. The extensiveness of this declaration can be supported through the following statements: "the greatest medical holocaust in history" and "the pandemic ranks with the plague of Justinian and the Black Death as one of the three most destructive human epidemics". Although the origin site for the pandemic has been widely debated, Barry follows the research findings of epidemiologist Edwin O. Jordan to claim that the disease originated from Haskell County, Kansas and was spread to army camps, across the US and then to Europe.

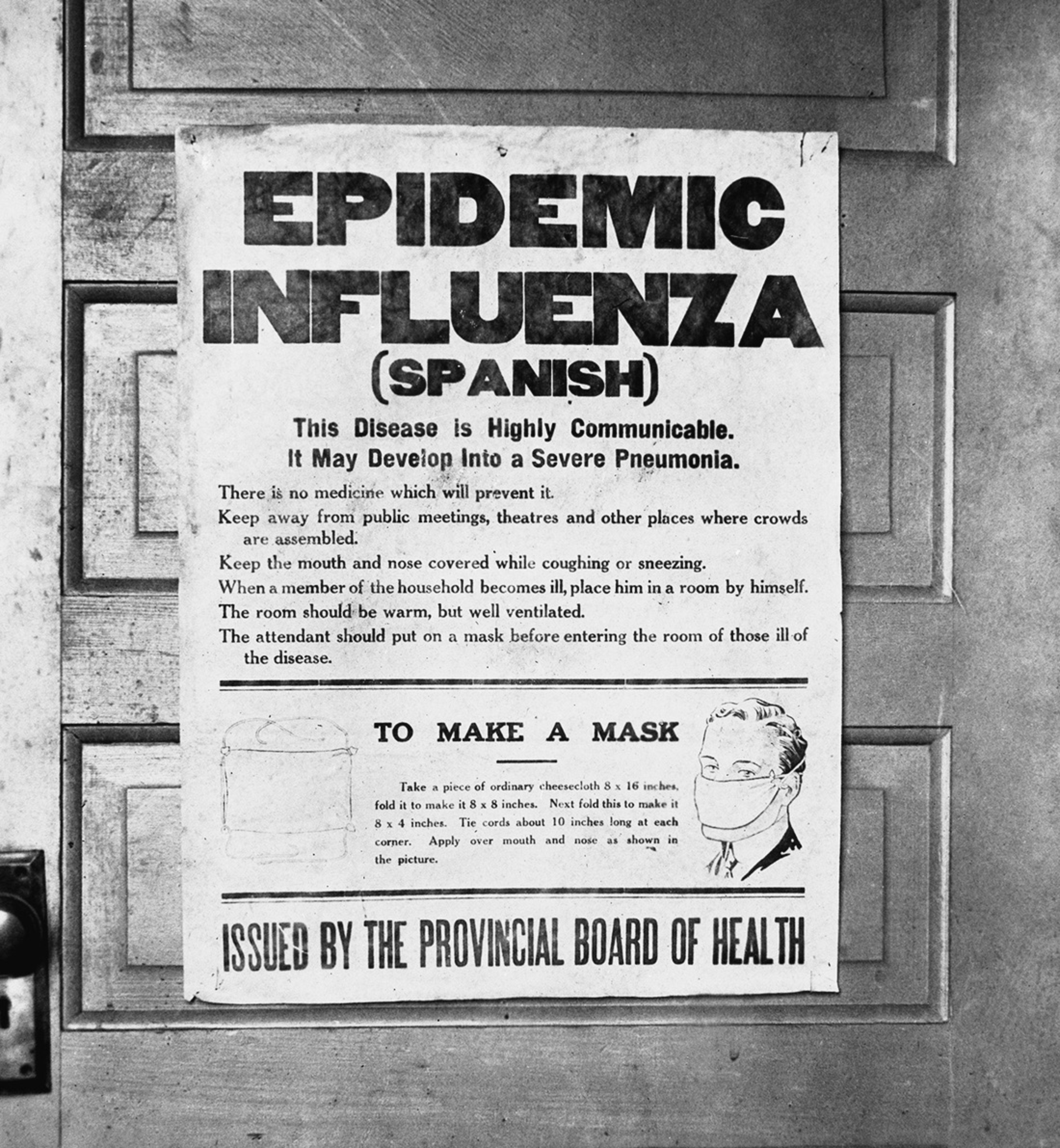
Influenza epidemic poster from 1918 demonstrating the colloquial use of referring to the disease as 'Spanish' (i.e. the Spanish flu).

The influenza strain of the 1918 pandemic infected approximately 500 million people and during the First World War, this viral infection reported more deaths than military engagement. Moreover, the disease caused the fatalities of more than 50 million people worldwide. During the development of this disease, the influenza strain, colloquially, became known as the ‘Spanish flu’ due to the fact that Spain was the first country to publicly report on the disease.

== Content ==
Barry's book reviews details of the events preceding, during and following the 1918 influenza pandemic.

Part 1 of the text includes accounts of various scientists and intellectuals throughout history, and describes their theories, and methodologies. He identifies and critiques the progression of science throughout history and the evolution of medicine to be performed as a science-based occupation. Specifically, the first part of Barry's text contextualises the US medical field in comparison to Europe, highlighting the inhibitors of progress in the US. Barry introduces William H. Welch as a key influential figure in US medicine due to him being an acclaimed ‘inspiration’ to many graduates from The Johns Hopkins University School of Medicine who went on to make vital discoveries in science. Moreover, this part of the text details the lack of advancement of other US medical schools compared to the Hopkins institution due to the Flexner Report that was introduced in 1919, specifically that 80% of medical schools were categorised as ‘poor quality’ and in need of closing. Moreover, Barry discusses Welch founding the Johns Hopkins School of Hygiene and Public Health in 1916 (Note: Renamed since 2001 the Johns Hopkins Bloomberg School of Public Health (or simply "The Bloomberg School"), in recognition of the institution's largest benefactor, Michael Bloomberg.) and serving as the School's first Dean (then titled "Director") until 1927.

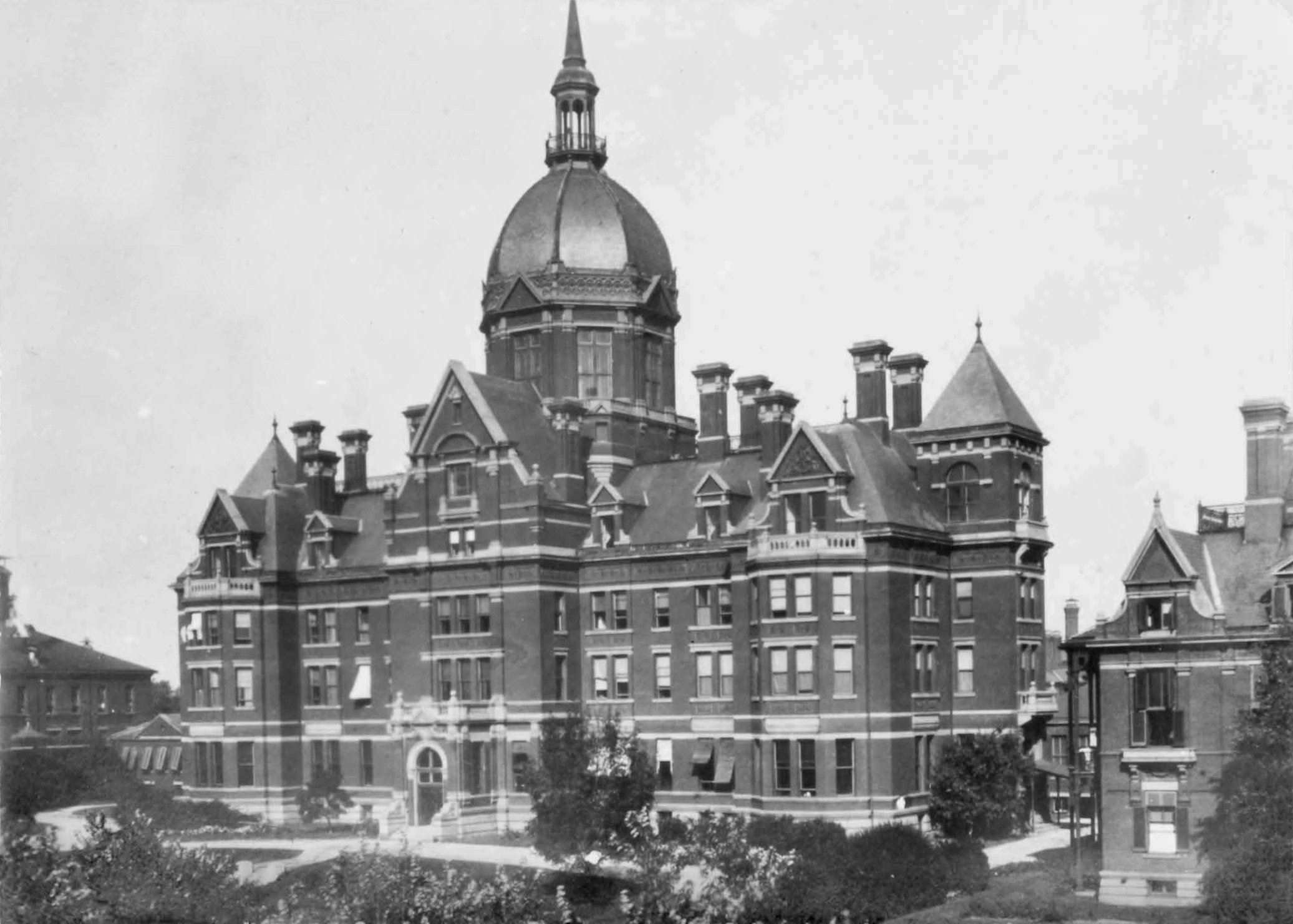
Johns Hopkins Hospital, early photo

Part 2 of the text identifies Haskell County, Kansas to be the origin site of the influenza strain based on epidemiological evidence derived from a local doctor to the site, Loring Miner and details the distribution across the US through army camps. Furthermore, Barry addresses the difficulty of explaining the origin of viruses, even in modern-day science and references this as an ‘enigma’. He defines what a virus is, specifically their function and the process of replication of viruses to produce iterations of original virus. Also, Barry narrates Influenza A virus subtype H1N1 originating from wild birds and discusses how the structure of the virus makes it suitable for attacking respiratory systems, hence also the reasoning for its rapid spread from host to host. Barry goes through the function of the immune system in recognising and fighting viruses, as well as the presence of mutations to impede the immune system's functionality.

Part 3 of the text examines the potential reasonings the US joined the First World War and their preparatory process, including creating a National Research Council that incorporated scientifically qualified men identified in the first part of the text to prevent this influenza spread. This council was created after an outbreak of measles spread severely within the US army troops and majority of the cases leading to pneumonia. Although a vaccine for pneumonia was eventually developed, a board was created for its specific consideration within the army. Barry discusses the shortage of medical professionals among civilians and President Woodrow Wilson’s drastic measures, to gather troops for the First World War, as key factors for the spread of the 1918 influenza virus.

Part 4, 5 and 6 of the text discusses the casualties due to the pandemic specifically in the second half of 1918, as well as comparing the first and second wave statistics. These parts include different forms of evidence that portray accounts of the public’s fear and uncertainty of the pandemic and the contributing influences to these emotions, specifically the misinformation or lack of information distributed by the media during this time period.

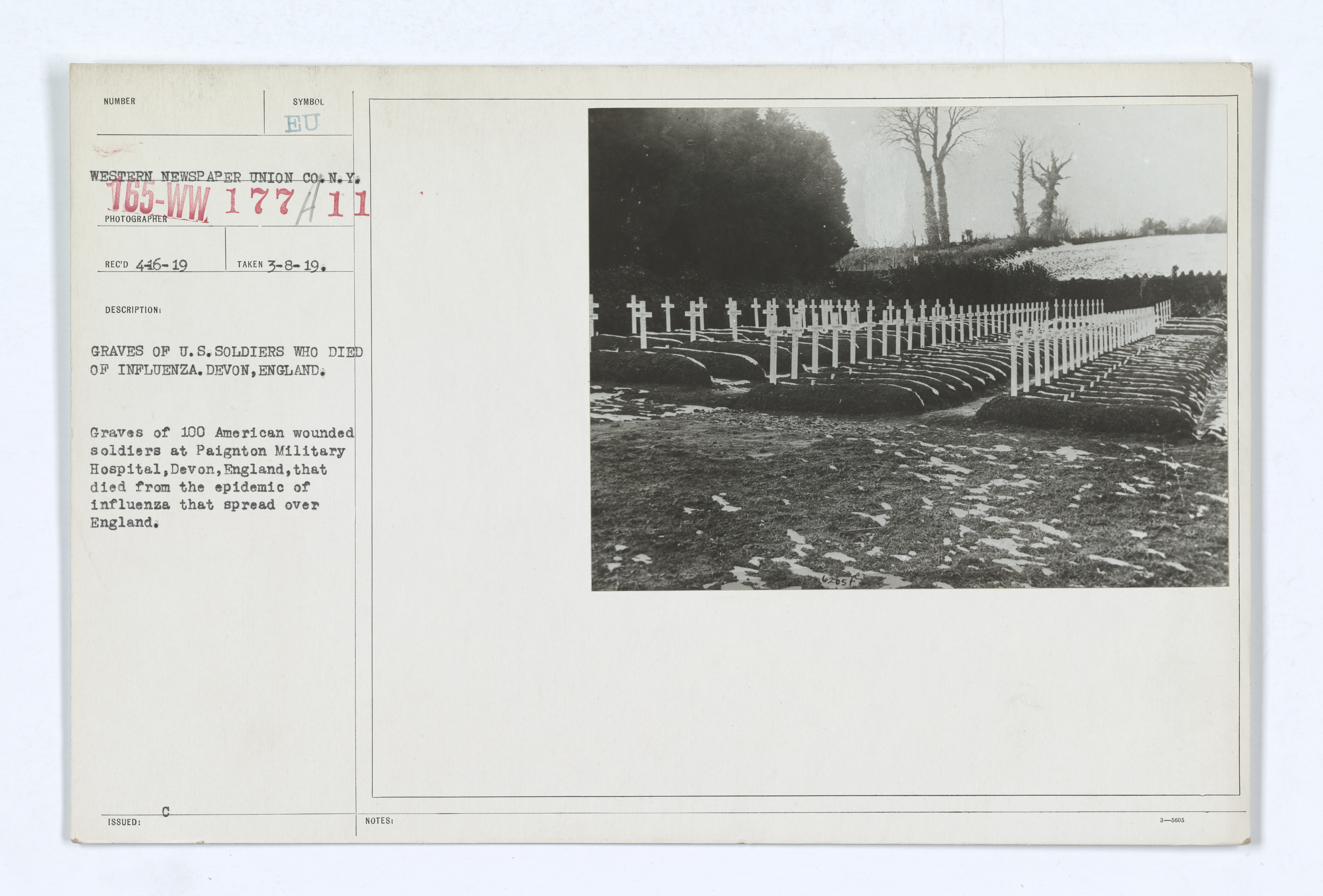
Graves of 100 American wounded soldiers at Paignton Military Hospital, Devon, England, that died from the epidemic of influenza.

Part 7 of the text details the accounts of scientists and their attempts to generate an effective vaccine to prevent the spread of the influenza strain. Barry narrates that the scientists at the time were tasked to understand the epidemiology of the influenza virus and identify the pathogen that was causing this disease. Although, the disease was identified as airborne, scientists were not successful in enforcing social distancing or lockdown to prevent the viral spread. Moreover, due to the inability to control this pandemic, Barry narrates that scientists rushed their methodology and processes of identifying the pathogen causing the virus. Most scientists followed the assumption that the causing pathogen was B influenzae. However, Barry states that when Welch has the virus, the scientist Oswald Avery maintained scientific protocol and process of experiment in the hopes of identifying the correct pathogen that was causing this virus.

Part 8 and 9 describes the conclusion of the pandemic, specifically detailing the scientific realisations, viral mutations and emotional aftermath caused by the pandemic. Barry narrates President Wilson’s unwillingness to follow scientists’ warnings and continued to send men to war which ultimately increased the spread of influenza in the tightly packed ships. Barry reports that the public health system was overwhelmed and that the only way the influenza outbreak could be mitigated was through quarantines, however they were not established by authority. Parts 8 and 9 outline the desperation of citizens to relieve symptoms and addresses individual concoctions to heal and untested vaccines being used, despite the knowledge that isolation was the only valid method of prevention of viral distribution. Barry details the consequence of numerous orphans due to the virus targeting young adults, as well as the public opinion distrusting their leaders and science.

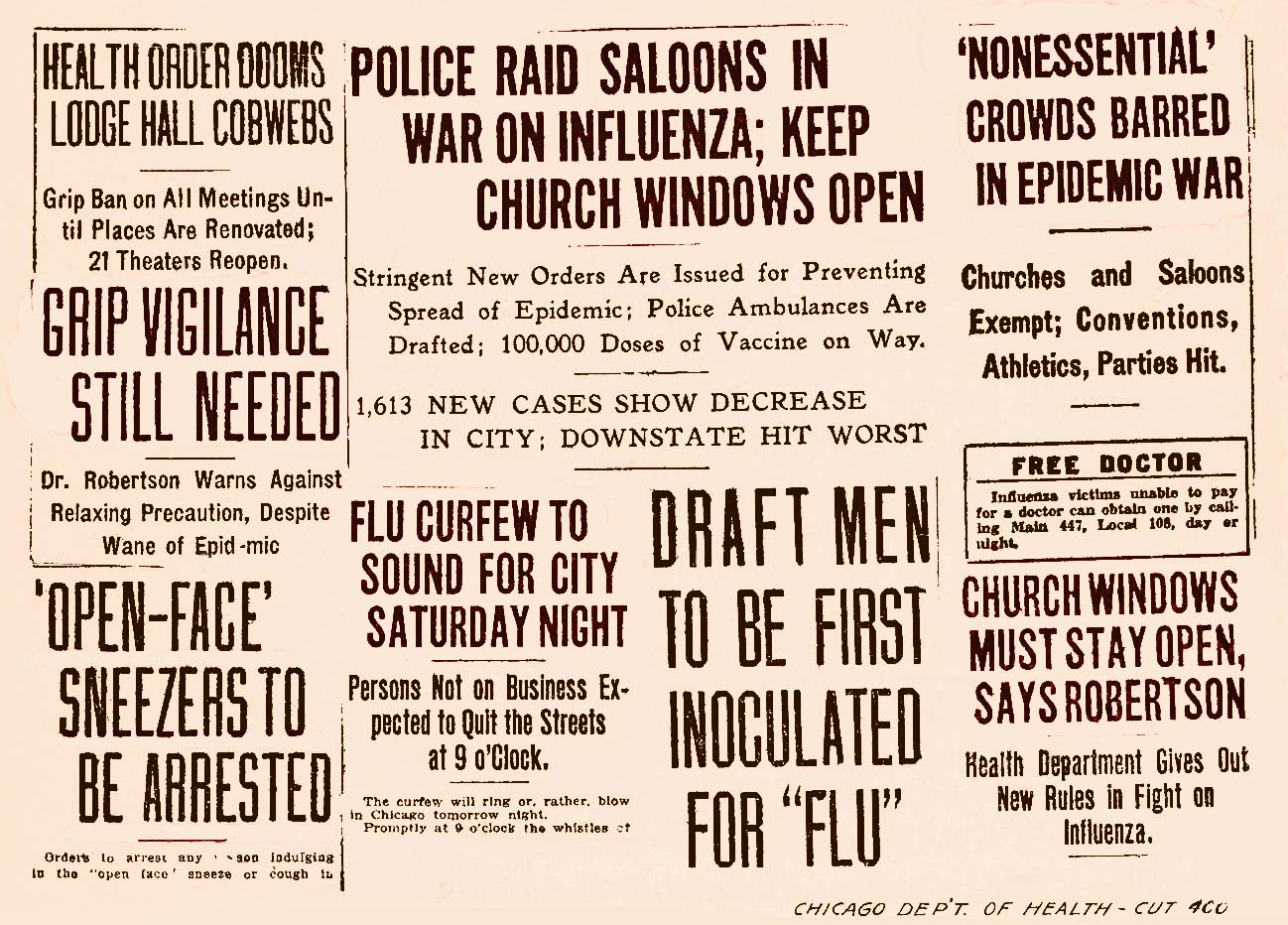
1918 Headlines from Chicago newspapers demonstrating the heightened focus on details of the pandemic in the media.

Finally, the last part of the text follows scientist Oswald Avery's continual researching of the pneumonia pathogen subsequent to the pandemic, and details his findings. Avery spent over a decade researching this and Barry states that his findings revolutionised the world of biology as he was the first scientist to prove that DNA carries genetic information. Barry concludes his narration of the events of the 1918 influenza pandemic with reference to scientists, Paul A. Lewis and Richard Shope, finally detecting the pathogen responsible for the pandemic, however not until 1931.

== Point of dispute: geographical origins ==
The geographical origins of the 1918 influenza virus is a familiar point of contention due to the various evidence-based claims. Although the origin site for the pandemic has been widely debated, Barry follows the research findings of epidemiologist Edwin O. Jordan to claim that the disease originated from Haskell County, Kansas and was spread to army camps, across the US and then to Europe. Nevertheless, the general consensus is more indistinct than Barry's claim; the acknowledgement being that the disease originated from the Midwest of the United States of America.

The location in which the H1N1 influenza A virus originated is a point of contention and has been acknowledged to be in China, the United States of America or Europe. Olson and colleagues critique the widely held viewpoint that the virus emerged from Kansas, USA; stating that this dominant belief “has become widely accepted without rigorous re-evaluation of the original evidence”. They suggest the idea of the virus originating in Europe and spreading to New York due to troop movements in the First World War. Moreover, this idea was initiated in 1919 by Dr William Hallock Park, a bacteriologist and the director of the New York City Health Department, in which he states that “observations in France and England indicated a filterable virus was present in at least one of the cases”. Moreover, it has been suggested by Langford that there might have been a mild outbreak of influenza in 1917 that travelled to England and France “via the personnel of the Chinese Labour Corps, then mutated to a more virulent form when the Chinese workers returned home in 1918”. However, this suggestion cannot be confirmed due to bacteriological and clinical data being too insubstantial and irregular.

Barry's theory regarding the geographical site of origin for the 1918 influenza virus is also problematic due to the ‘herald wave’ that was evident during the beginning months of 1918 in not only New York, USA, but also in military camps throughout Norway during the same time period. Although Barry's discussion of the virus first emerging in Kansas, USA is widely accepted, it is evident that it is a point of contention in the word of science.

== Textual comparison ==
John M. Barry, author of The Great Influenza, has been considered alongside Alfred W. Crosby, author of the America’s Forgotten Pandemic to have done ‘ground breaking’ historiographical work on the 1918 influenza pandemic. Crosby's text, first published in 1976, is considered a dominant historical text unpacking the events of the 1918 influenza virus and significantly discusses the significant presence of the First World War to ‘shadow’ details of the pandemic into obscurity. This is relevant as Barry's text was originally published in 2004, 28 years after Crosby's America’s Forgotten Pandemic. Hence, although it has been stated that Barry ‘echoes’ Crosby's historical research in The Great Influenza, he has a stronger emphasis on the biology. Also, Barry's had the opportunity to collate 28 years of further research and commentary to better inform his text's historical, and biological narrative of the 1918 influenza.

== Reviews ==
Stephen C. Schoenbaum comments on John Barry's non-fiction text through his 2004 review by critically stating that the text "includes lots of interesting tidbits, some relevant, some not, some accurate, and some not". Furthermore, Schoenbaum identifies 'telling stories' as a strong component of the text, however its historical overview should not be considered 'definitive'. Nevertheless, Barry's text is declared as a "rewarding experience" with other scholarly authors not presenting the "same combination of interests as Mr Barry".

Andrew Noymer recognises the broad audience regarding accessibility of Barry's non-fiction text and its focus on specific historical, and medical matters. This is evident through his statement, "… the book is written for a general audience as well as for academic experts". Moreover, Noymer indicates the questionable reliability of Barry's anecdotes as "not all anecdotes… [were] documented by sources in the endnotes". Hence, suggesting there to be an issue when evaluating the book as "a piece of historical research"

Joseph Topinka, Daniel Molnar, Brandon Gardner and Rosemary Wosky extensively evaluate the quality of John Barry's text The Great Influenza: The Epic Story of the Deadliest Plague in History in their 2015 review. The review recognises the historical framework Barry provides for understanding the social environment, as well as the political issues of the influenza pandemic. The review declares "Barry's description of the spreading of the influenza and the reaction to it by the local and national governments all provide lessons from which we can learn". Hence, Topinka et al. indicate their perspective of the didactic nature of the text, specifically regarding decision-making or lack thereof, as well as advocating for public education and alteration of legal frameworks under public health law. They agree with Barry's discussion of the historical spread of this disease, specifically that "we must learn from the influenza pandemic of 1918".

A 2004 Journal of Clinical Investigation review said that the book was "well conceived, well researched, and extremely well written" targeting a broad audience—physicians, scientists, medical students, and history buffs. Barry Gewen of The New York Times praised it saying "He is a good teacher, in part because he assumes that his readers don't know anything. He explains the technical stuff clearly, with nice, homey analogies".

== Reaction ==
In the summer of 2005, then-President George W. Bush read the book while on vacation at his ranch in Crawford. His study would later set forth plans for the federal government to prepare for future pandemics in a November 2005 speech.

In 2020, the book experienced a surge in popularity as a result of the COVID-19 pandemic.
