= Rabies in animals =

Deadly zoonotic disease

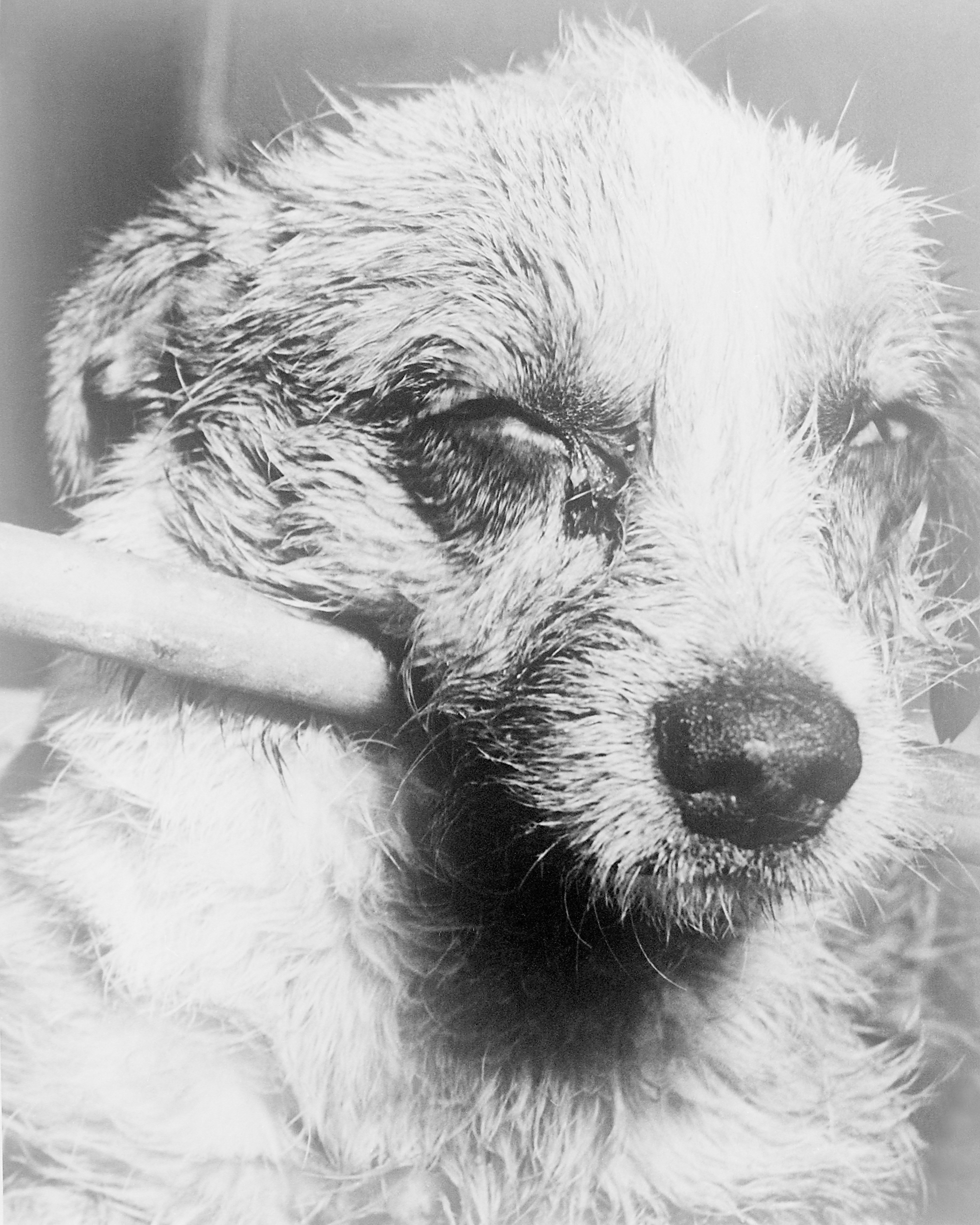
Close-up of a dog during late-stage ("dumb") paralytic rabies. Animals with "dumb" rabies appear depressed, lethargic, and uncoordinated. Gradually they become completely paralyzed. When their throat and jaw muscles are paralyzed, the animals will drool and have difficulty swallowing.

In animals, rabies is a viral zoonotic neuro-invasive disease which causes inflammation in the brain and is usually fatal. Rabies, caused by the rabies virus, primarily infects mammals. In the laboratory it has been found that birds can be infected, as well as their cell cultures. The brains of animals with rabies deteriorate. As a result, they tend to behave bizarrely and often aggressively, increasing the chances that they will bite another organism and spread the disease.

In addition to aggression, the virus can induce hydrophobia ("fear of water")—wherein attempts to drink water or swallow cause painful spasms of the muscles in the throat or larynx—and an increase in saliva production. This aids the likelihood of transmission, as the virus multiplies and accumulates in the salivary glands and is transmitted primarily through biting. The accumulation of saliva can sometimes create a "foaming at the mouth" effect, which is commonly associated with rabies in animals in the public perception and in popular culture; however, rabies does not always present as such, and may be carried without typical symptoms being displayed.

Rabies kills an average of 70,000 people a year worldwide. Dogs are the primary cause of the virus infecting humans in most parts of the world, but in some countries, such as the United States and Canada, bats are the principal vector.

== Stages of disease ==
Three stages of rabies are recognized in dogs and other animals.

1. The first stage, known as the prodromal stage, is a one- to three-day period that occurs once the virus reaches the brain, and enters the beginning of encephalitis. Outwardly, it is characterized by behavioral changes such as restlessness, deep fatigue, and pain indications such as self-biting or itching. Some animals demonstrate more social behavior, while others conversely self-isolate; this is an early warning sign of the pathogen changing the hosts’ behavior to speed up transmission. Physical shifts such as fever, or nausea may also be present. Once this stage is reached, treatment is usually no longer viable. The onset of the prodromal stage can vary significantly, which can be attested to factors such as the strain of the virus, the viral load, the route of transmission, and the distance the virus must travel up the peripheral nerves to the central nervous system. The incubation period can be between months to years in humans but typically averages down to weeks or as little as a day in most mammals.
2. The second stage is the excitative stage, which lasts three to four days. It is this stage that is often known as furious rabies due to the tendency of the affected animal to be hyperreactive to external stimuli and bite at anything near.
3. The third stage is the paralytic or "dumb" stage and is caused by damage to motor neurons. Incoordination is seen due to rear limb paralysis and drooling and difficulty swallowing is caused by paralysis of facial and throat muscles. This disables the host's ability to swallow, which causes saliva to pour from the mouth. This causes bites to be the most common way for the infection to spread, as the virus is most concentrated in the throat and cheeks, causing major contamination to saliva. Death is usually caused by respiratory arrest.

== Treatment ==
It is recommended that 5 doses of the canine rabies vaccine be administered after an animal is suspected to have been exposed to the virus. These vaccines should be administered on day 0, 3, 14, 21, and 35. On day 1 a murine anti-rabies antibody should also be administered if the animal was previously unvaccinated. A booster shot should also be administered one year after the first vaccine.

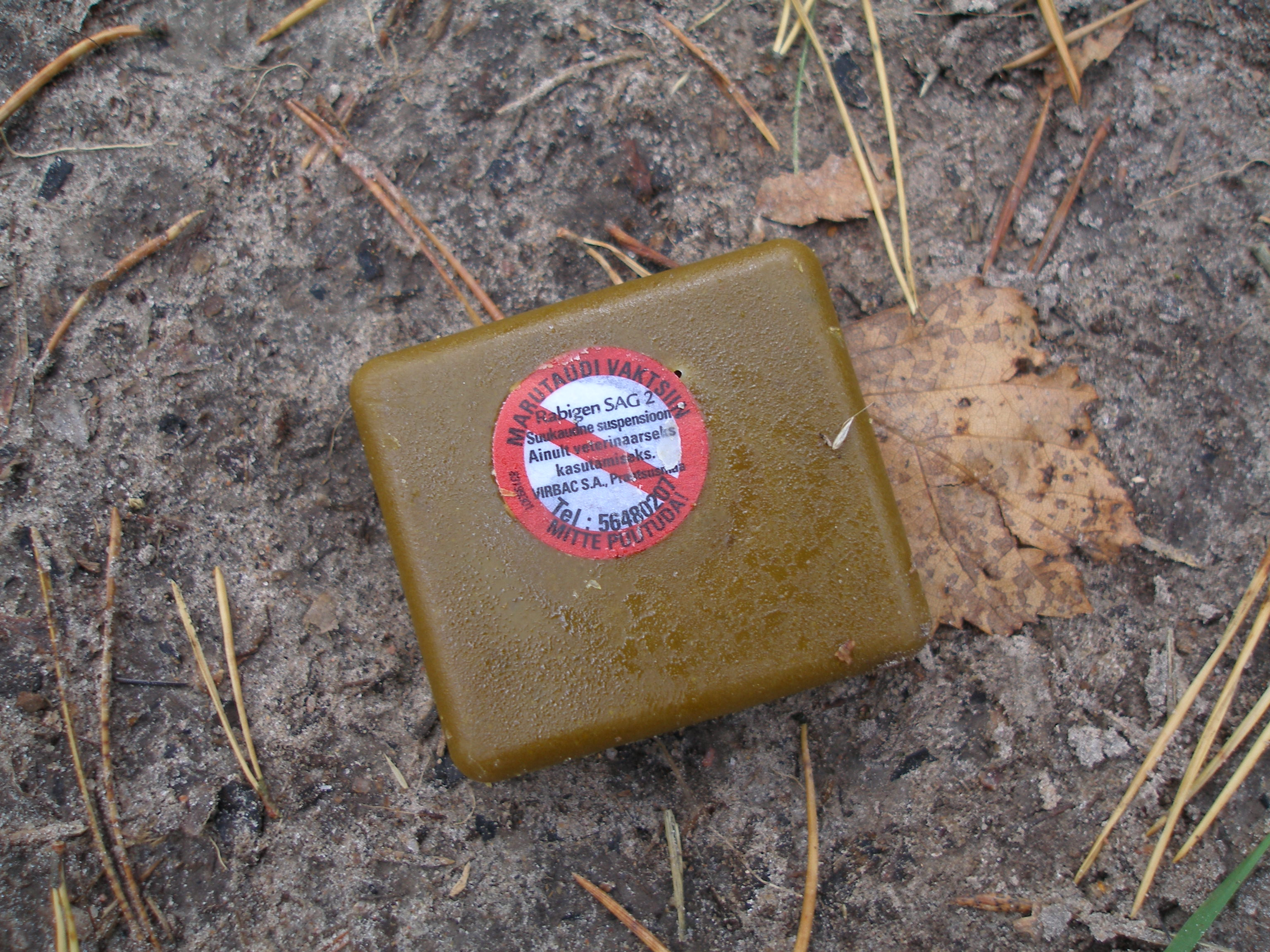
SAG-2 rabies vaccine in bait block

== Mammals ==
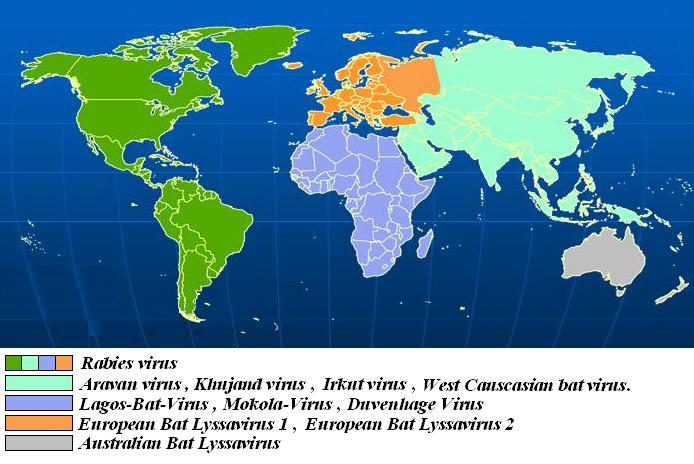
Geographical distribution of lyssaviruses carried by bats

=== Bats ===
Bats throughout North and South America carry the classical rabies virus (RABV), while in other parts of the world they carry other lyssaviruses. Rabies in bats was first closely studied in Trinidad in the West Indies. From 1925 to 1935, 89 people on the island, and thousands of livestock, died from it—"the highest human mortality from rabies-infected bats thus far recorded anywhere."

In 1931, Dr. Joseph Lennox Pawan of Trinidad in the West Indies, a government bacteriologist, found Negri bodies in the brain of a bat with unusual habits. In 1932, Dr. Pawan discovered that infected vampire bats could transmit rabies to humans and other animals. In 1934, the Trinidad and Tobago government began a program of eradicating vampire bats, while encouraging the screening off of livestock buildings and offering free vaccination programs for exposed livestock.

After the opening of the Trinidad Regional Virus Laboratory in 1953, Arthur Greenhall demonstrated that at least eight species of bats in Trinidad had been infected with rabies; including the common vampire bat, the rare white-winged vampire bat, as well as two abundant species of fruit bats: Seba's short-tailed bat and the Jamaican fruit bat.

Recent data sequencing suggests recombination events in an American bat led the modern rabies virus to gain the head of a G-protein ectodomain thousands of years ago. This change occurred in an organism that had both rabies and a separate carnivore virus. The recombination resulted in a cross-over that gave rabies a new success rate across hosts since the G-protein ectodomain, which controls binding and pH receptors, was now suited for carnivore hosts as well.

Cryptic rabies refers to unidentified infections, which are mainly traced back to particularly virulent forms in silver-haired and tricolor bats. These are generally rather reclusive species, so the relative degree of infection and similarities between their strains is unusual. Both are independent rabies reservoir species but make up a large number of bites. This absence of typical symptoms can often cause major delays in treatment and diagnosis in both animals and humans, as the required post-exposure prophylaxis and dFAT tests may not be run.

=== Bears ===
It is extremely rare for bears to be rabid, although it is possible. In 2025, a bear which attacked a man in Pennsylvania was confirmed to be rabid. The first confirmed rabies case in a polar bear occurred in 1989 in Northwest Territories in Canada.

=== Cats ===
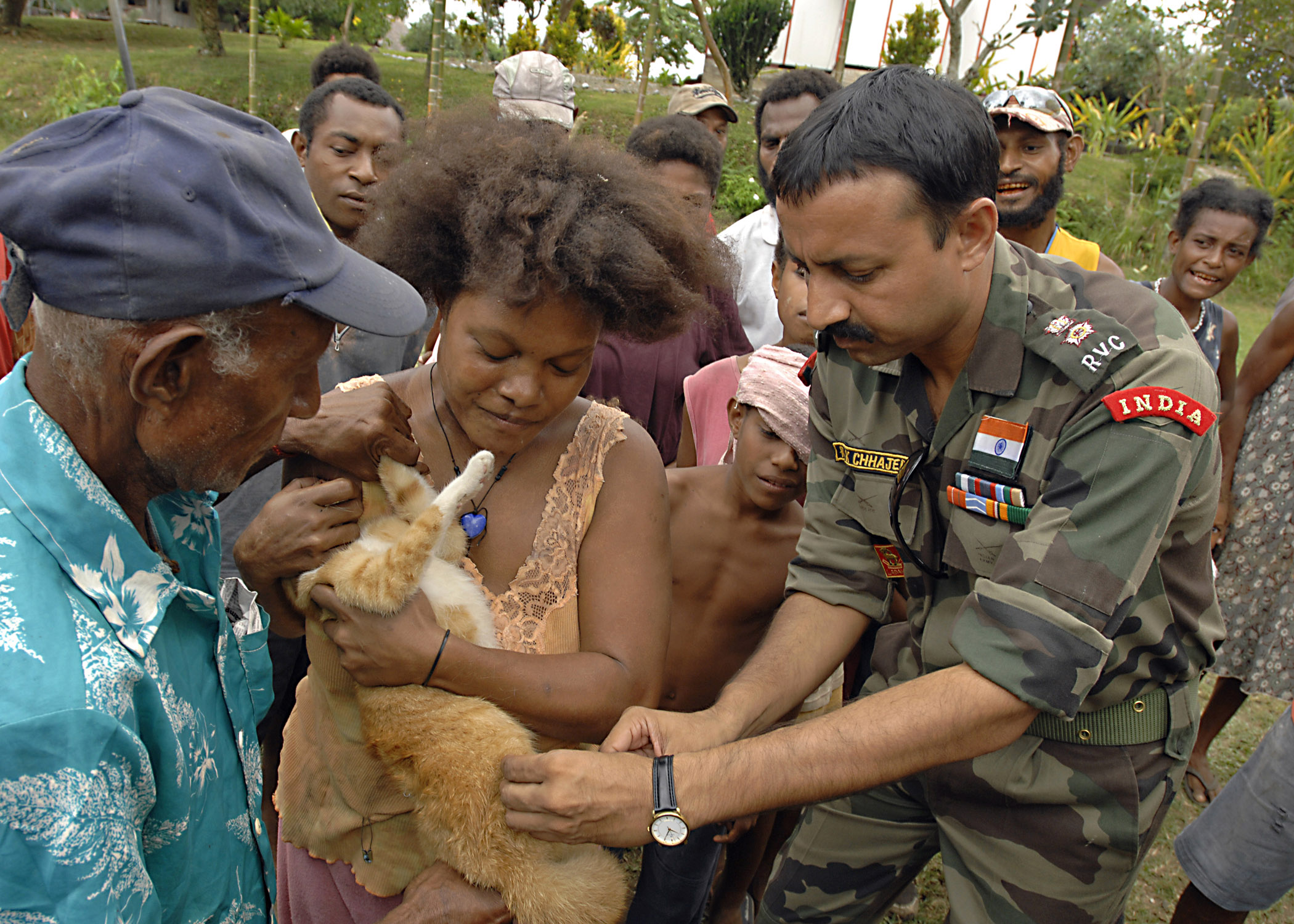
A cat being vaccinated against rabies in Papua New Guinea.

In the United States, domestic cats are the most commonly reported rabid animal. In the United States, as of 2008, between 200 and 300 cases are reported annually; in 2017, 276 cats with rabies were reported. As of 2010, in every year since 1990, reported cases of rabies in cats outnumbered cases of rabies in dogs.

Cats that have not been vaccinated and are allowed access to the outdoors have the greatest risk of contracting rabies, as they may come in contact with rabid animals. The virus is often passed on during fights between cats or other animals and is transmitted through bites, saliva or mucous membranes and fresh wounds. The virus can incubate from one day up to over a year before any symptoms appear. Symptoms have a rapid onset and can include unusual aggression, restlessness, lethargy, anorexia, weakness, disorientation, paralysis and seizures. Vaccination of felines (including boosters) by a veterinarian is recommended to prevent rabies infection in outdoor cats.

=== Cattle ===
In cattle-raising areas where vampire bats are common, fenced-in cows often become a primary target for the bats (along with horses), due to their easy accessibility compared to wild mammals. In Latin America, vampire bats are the primary reservoir of the rabies virus, and in Peru, for instance, researchers have calculated that over 500 cattle per year die of bat-transmitted rabies.

Vampire bats have been extinct in the United States for thousands of years (a situation that may reverse due to climate change, as the range of vampire bats in northern Mexico has recently been creeping northward with warmer weather), thus United States cattle are not currently susceptible to rabies from this vector. However, 2 cases of rabies in dairy cows in the United States, in which people have been exposed through unpasteurized milk, have occurred since 1996. In both of these incidents it is likely that the cows received the virus from raccoons. In 1998, a cow with rabies was milked 12 times within the week before it died. This milk was mixed with milk from other cows and distributed for consumption. 66 people who drank the milk were found and all received PEP. The other incident occurred in 1996 and 14 people were treated with PEP.

Vaccination programs in Latin America have been effective at protecting cattle from rabies, along with other approaches such as the culling of vampire bat populations.

=== Coyotes ===
Rabies is common in coyotes, and can be a cause for concern if they interact with humans.

=== Dogs ===
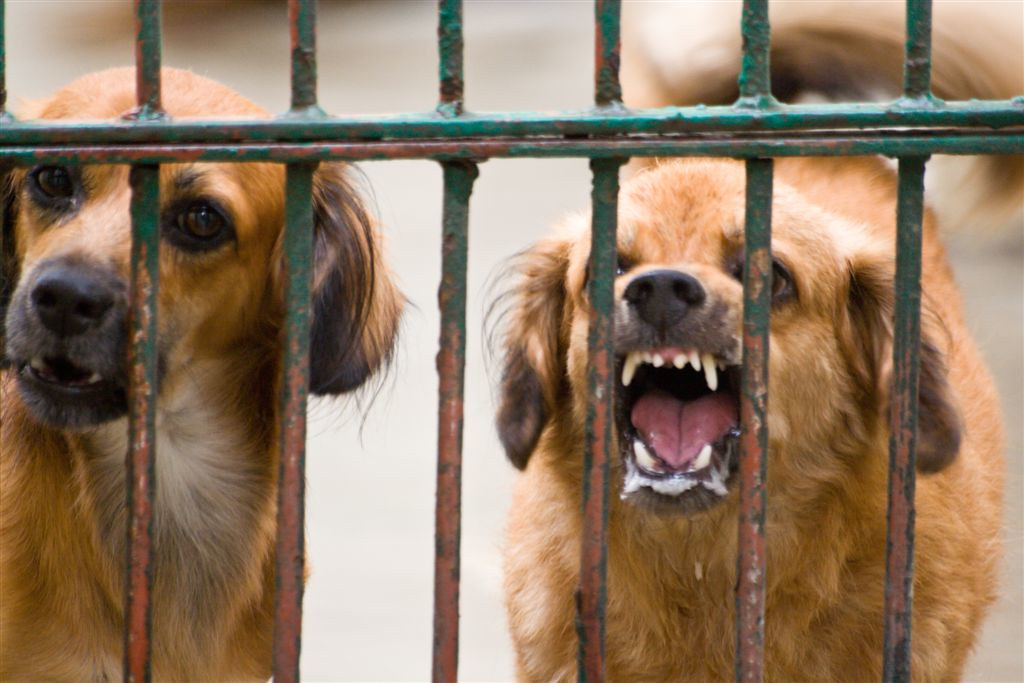
Two of the characteristic features that help identify the rabies virus in dogs, aggressiveness and salivation

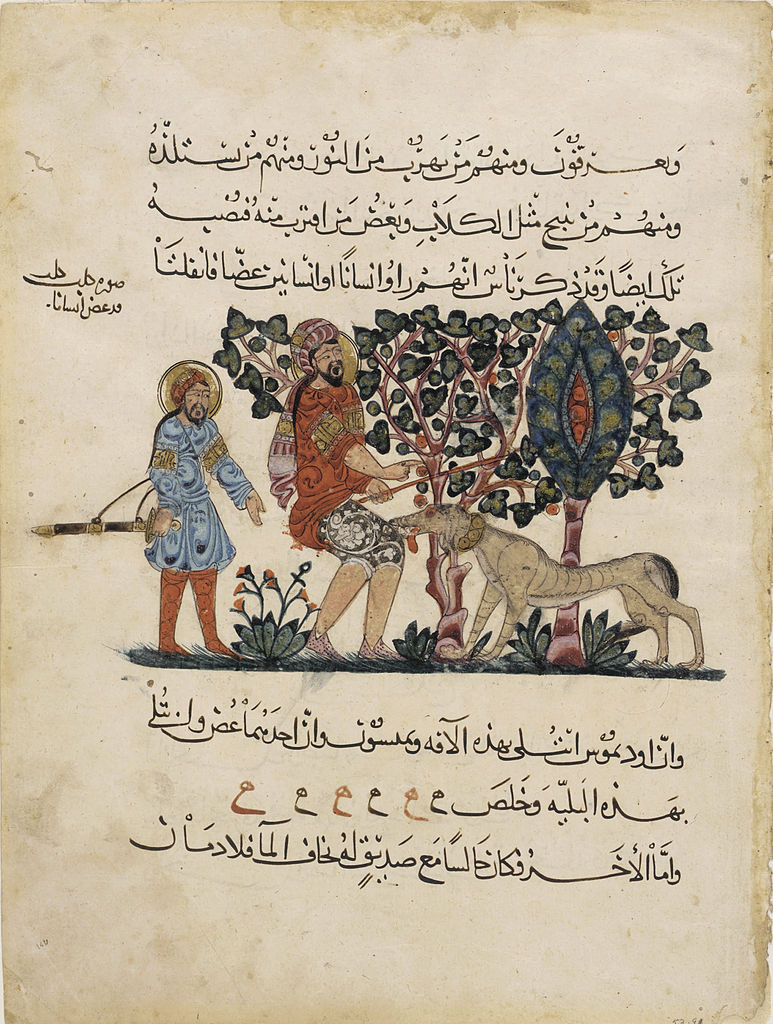
A folio from 1224 depicting a rabid dog biting a man.

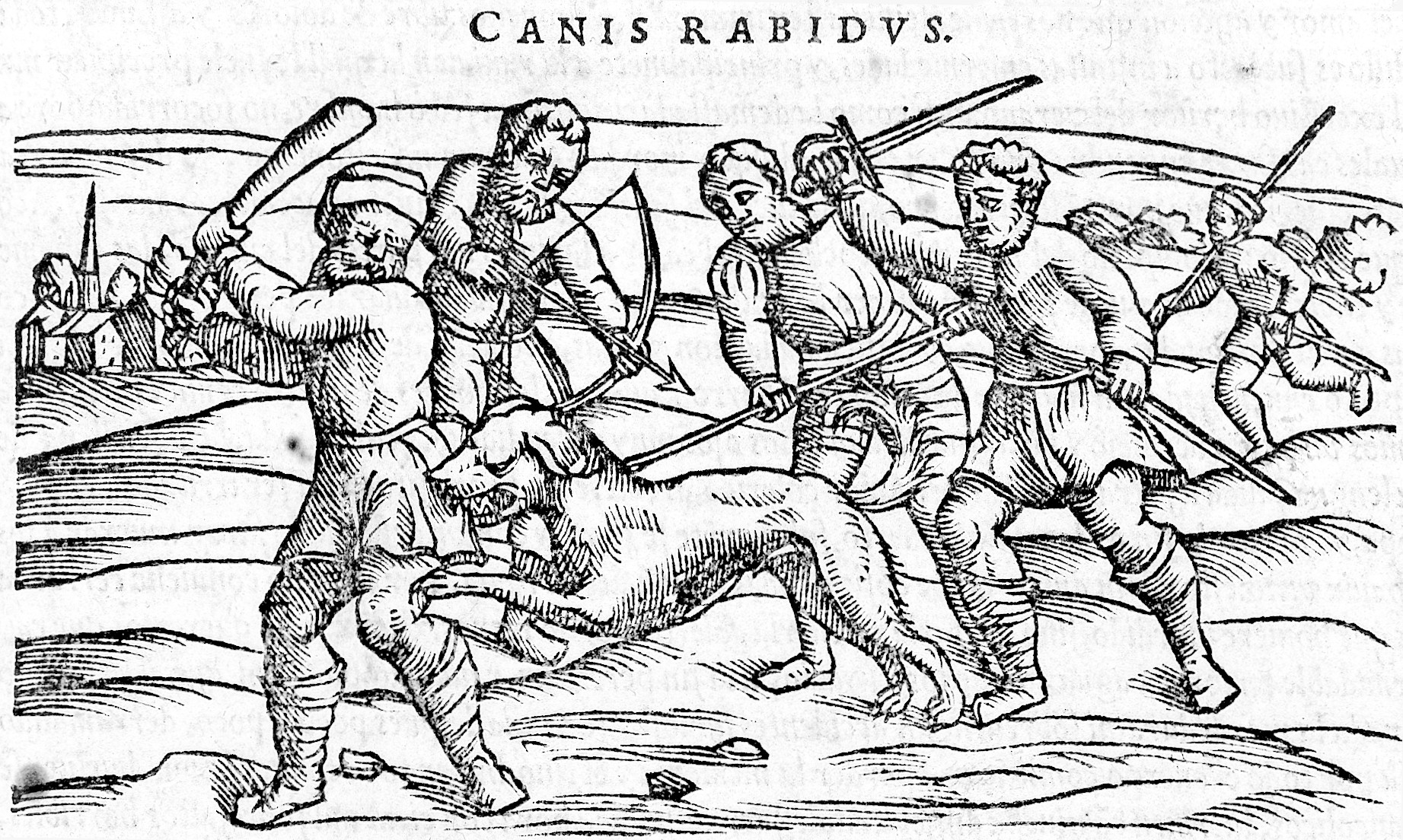
An image from 1566 depicting a group of men using an assortment of weapons to try and kill a rabid dog who is biting one of the men on the leg.

Dogs represent by far the most common animal involved in the transmission of rabies to humans. At a global level, dog bites and scratches are responsible for 99% of human rabies cases.

Rabies has a long history of association with dogs. The first written record of rabies is in the Codex of Eshnunna (c. 1930 BC), which dictates that the owner of a dog showing symptoms of rabies should take preventive measure against bites. If a person was bitten by a rabid dog and later died, the owner was fined heavily.

Dog mediated rabies is defined as "any case caused by rabies virus maintained in the dog population (Canis lupus familiaris) independently of other animal reservoir species, as determined by epidemiological studies". Most Western countries have eliminated dog mediated rabies, but it remains prevalent in developing countries. In countries where dog-mediated rabies has been eliminated, unvaccinated dogs can still contract rabies from being bitten by a rabid animal, such as a fox, coyote, jackal, raccoon and skunk. In the United States, in 2022, 50 dogs tested positive for rabies.

Dog-mediated rabies is still very common in countries in Africa and Asia. In India, dog-mediated rabies is endemic; with rabies being primarily transmitted to humans from dogs (97% of human rabies cases), followed by cats (2%), jackals, mongooses, and others (1%).

The incubation period from rabies in dogs can be anywhere from a week to several months. Many dogs develop dumb rabies which can go ignored and many other dogs die before being diagnosed. Symptoms of the disease in dogs include, personality changes, raised temperature, dilated pupils, a nictitating membrane, and excessive salivation.

=== Foxes ===
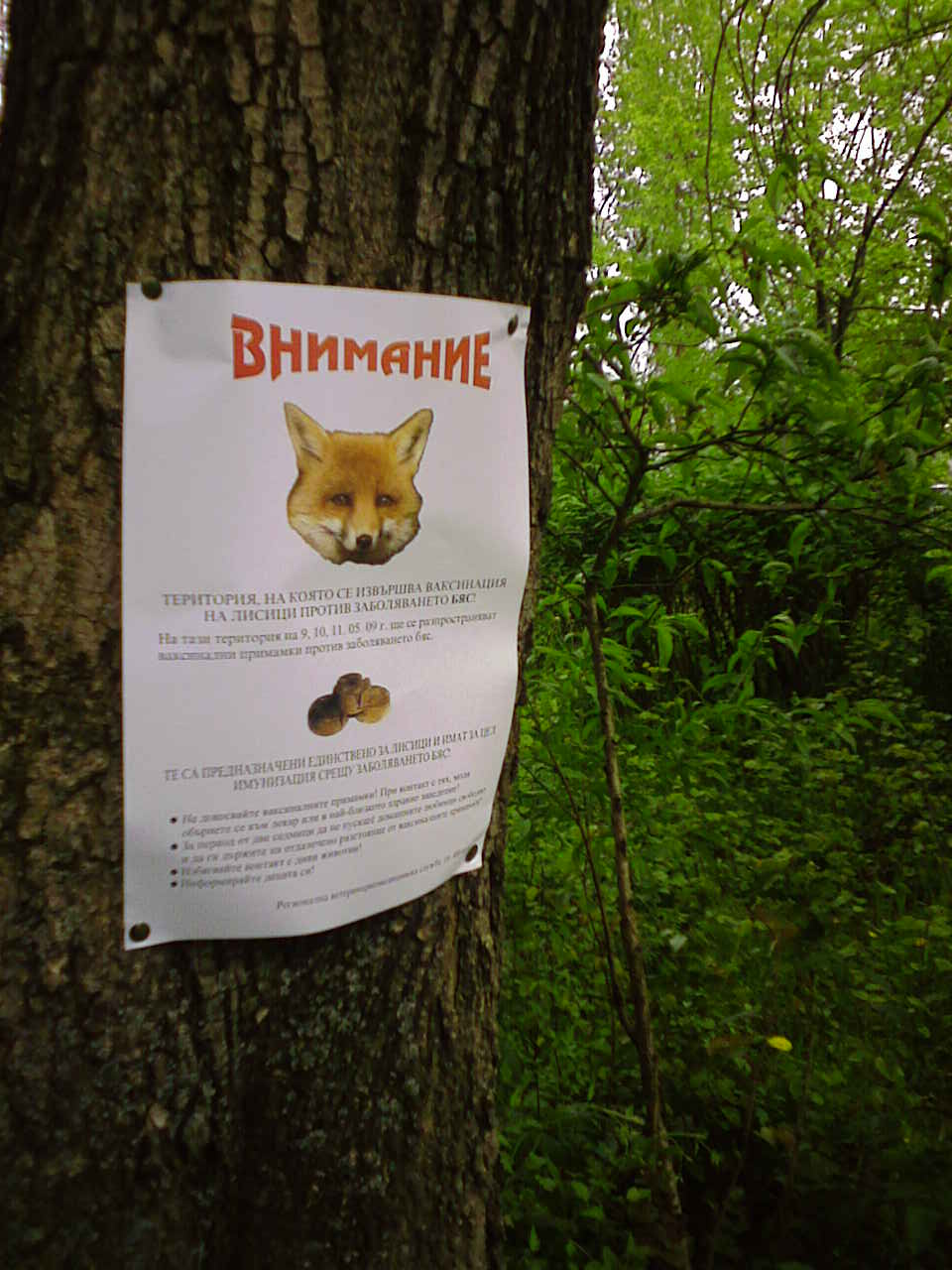
A poster warning the public about an upcoming campaign of rabies oral vaccination of foxes in Bulgaria

Rabies in foxes is endemic throughout most of the world, though incubation time and antigen types shift depending on its host. In areas of Europe where terrestrial rabies is still present, red foxes are the main vector, with Europe having struggled for decades with fox-mediated rabies, understood to have originated from a 1930s outbreak in red foxes in Kaliningrad, and having spread throughout Europe subsequently.

Arctic rabies is a specific strain of Rabies lyssavirus that is most closely phylogenetically related to a separate strand halfway down the world in India and has an incubation period that can last up to six months, comparable to that of the virus in humans. It is very rarely studied due to difficulties in lab cultivation and in finding samples, but studies have shown unique antigenic variants in different hosts, most commonly the arctic fox, Vulpes lagopus, a highly dense species. Though this strain is claimed to be less pathogenic to humans, that may be a correlation to low exposure rates rather than a physiological fact.

=== Horses ===
Rabies can be contracted in horses if they interact with rabid animals in their pasture, usually through being bitten (e.g. by vampire bats) on the muzzle or lower limbs. Signs include aggression, incoordination, head-pressing, circling, lameness, muscle tremors, convulsions, colic and fever. Horses that experience the paralytic form of rabies have difficulty swallowing, and drooping of the lower jaw due to paralysis of the throat and jaw muscles. Incubation of the virus may range from 2–9 weeks. In a study done on 21 horses with rabies, death occurred within 1-7 days with an average time of survival of 4.47 days. It is currently recommended for horses to receive a yearly vaccine; however, in a study done on 93 horses, it was discovered that the rabies vaccine could provide prolonged immunity to the virus for up to eight years.

=== Jackals ===
Rabies is common in jackals, especially in Southern Africa, being present in black-backed jackals and side-striped jackals. It is also present in golden jackals, particularly in parts of the Middle East.

=== Monkeys ===
Monkeys, like humans, can get rabies; however, they do not tend to be a common source of rabies. Monkeys with rabies tend to die more quickly than humans. In one study, 9 of 10 monkeys developed severe symptoms or died within 20 days of infection. Monkeys as an infectious agent are often a concern for individuals residing in or travelling to developing countries as they are the second most common source of rabies after dogs in many of these places.

=== Pigs ===
Rabies is rare in pigs, but it can occur. In 2007, there was an outbreak of rabies in pigs in China, in Hunan province, with the virus having been contracted from dogs.

=== Rabbits ===
Although natural infection of rabbits is rare, they are particularly vulnerable to the rabies virus. Rabbits were used to develop the first rabies vaccine by Louis Pasteur in the 1880s, and continue to be used for rabies diagnostic testing. The virus is often contracted when a rabbit is attacked by another rabid animal and can incubate for up to two to three weeks. Symptoms include weakness in limbs, head tremors, low appetite, nasal discharge, and death within three to four days. There are currently no vaccines available for rabbits. The National Institutes of Health recommends that rabbits be kept indoors or enclosed in hutches outside that do not allow other animals to come in contact with them.

=== Raccoons ===
Raccoons are a major rabies reservoir in the eastern part of United States. They carry the raccoon rabies variant of the rabies virus. The earliest known outbreak occurred in Florida in the 1950s, spreading into neighboring Georgia by 1962. In 1977, an outbreak started in West Virginia near the Virginia border, presumably caused by the transportation of 3,500 raccoons from Florida to Virginia for hunting. Raccoon rabies eventually spread to cover the entire East Coast. In Canada, a raccoons rabies outbreak occurred in Southern Ontario in 2015. They are also present in Quebec and in New Brunswick.

=== Red pandas ===
Although rare, cases of rabies in red pandas have been recorded.

=== Cape fur seals ===
In South Africa, Cape fur seals were reported to have attacked people on the West Coast. In July 2024, it was confirmed that 17 seals along a 650-km stretch of coastline between Cape Town and Plettenberg Bay tested positive for rabies, and that could be the cause of the attacking behaviour in fur seals. The hypothesis is the rabies was acquired from black-backed jackals who prey on the seals; rabies is endemic among southern African jackals.

=== Skunks ===
In the United States, there is currently no USDA-approved vaccine for the strain of rabies that afflicts skunks. When cases are reported of pet skunks biting a human, the animals are frequently killed in order to be tested for rabies. It has been reported that three different variants of rabies exist in striped skunks in the north and south central states.

=== Wolves ===
Under normal circumstances, wild wolves are generally timid around humans, though there are several reported circumstances in which wolves have been recorded to act aggressively toward humans. The majority of fatal wolf attacks have historically involved rabies, which was first recorded in wolves in the 13th century. The earliest recorded case of an actual rabid wolf attack comes from Germany in 1557. Though wolves are not reservoirs for the disease, they can catch it from other species. Wolves develop an exceptionally severe aggressive state when infected and can bite numerous people in a single attack. Before a vaccine was developed, bites were almost always fatal. Today, wolf bites can be treated, but the severity of rabid wolf attacks can sometimes result in outright death, or a bite near the head will make the disease act too fast for the treatment to take effect.

Rabid attacks tend to cluster in winter and spring. With the reduction of rabies in Europe and North America, few rabid wolf attacks have been recorded, though some still occur annually in the Middle East. Rabid attacks share characteristics which can be used to differentiate them from predatory attacks: rabid wolves limit themselves to biting their victims rather than consuming them; victims of rabid wolves are usually attacked around the head and neck in a sustained manner; the timespan of predatory attacks can sometimes last for months or years, whereas rabid attacks usually end within a fortnight.

=== Asian elephants ===
One of the largest land mammals on the continent of Asia, these elephants typically live in India, Indonesia, Nepal, and Cambodia: countries that have ongoing rabies epidemics. About 1.4% of these elephants die from rabies, most of these cases come from bites/attacks from wild dogs. When left untreated, the mammal can suffer from paralytic or dumb rabies and their limbs slowly begin to paralyze. With that, hunger decreases, bowel movements begin to cease, and the elephant's behavior can begin to change. After five days, the animal dies. When treated, elephants receive the 'equine tetanus toxoid' annually. These vaccinated elephants can develop a humoral immune response and combat the deadly symptoms of the rabies virus.

=== Other placental mammals ===
The most commonly infected terrestrial animals in the United States are raccoons, armadillos, skunks, foxes, and coyotes. Any bites by such wild animals must be considered a possible exposure to the rabies virus.

Rabies is rare in rodents and lagomorphs; however, there is still a chance they can transmit rabies to humans. While the number is still small, cases of rabid rodents and lagomorphs have been increasing. Most cases of rabies are reported to be spill-over from rabies epidemics in nearby raccoon populations. Groundhogs specifically have the highest rate of being reported rabid.

Outside of the United States, extensive research has been conducted on animals outside the norm of usual infection patterns. The yellow mongoose, native to South Africa, has been known to carry the rabies virus asymptomatically for several years. In a study performed in 1993, several major outbreaks in adjacent farms over the course of 11 years were all traced to a single population. The long dormant phase of this virus makes horizontal transfer possible through breeding and typical injuries from territory fights. The cause of the virus's emergence into the prodromal stage is hypothesized to be stressors, such as lack of food, or other stressors in heavily populated areas. A further complication is the difficulty in testing for rabies before death, as it takes up cells around the brainstem and in the nerves and saliva.

In the same geographic region, the greater kudu, a species of antelope in Namibia, has also suffered enormous outbreaks of rabies in its populations. The greater kudu is a member of the Tragelaphini antelopes, which is more closely related to cows than to other antelopes and is extremely susceptible to the virus. During the first epidemic from 1996 to 1997, as much as 20% of the population succumbed to the disease; phylogenetic analyses proved that the rapid spread was largely by horizontal transfer. Kudu are a large factor in the agriculture and economy of Namibia, but their status as wildlife makes prevention of the disease much more difficult.

=== Marsupial and monotreme mammals ===
The Virginia opossum (a marsupial, unlike the other mammals named above, which are all eutherians/placental) is known to be resistant, but not immune, to rabies.

== Birds ==
Birds were first artificially infected with rabies in 1884, with work being done on a large variety of species, including domestic fowl and pigeons. Hundreds of years of testing has concluded that infected birds are largely, if not wholly, asymptomatic, and recover; a 1988 study examined a number of birds of prey, such as red-tailed hawks, bald eagles, horned owls, and turkey vultures, and concluded that they were unlikely to be reservoirs of rabies. Rabies was also diagnosed in domestic fowl in 2015, having been infected by a stray dog. Other bird species have been known to develop rabies antibodies, a sign of infection, after feeding on rabies-infected mammals.

== See also ==
- Prevalence of rabies
- Rabies transmission
- Rabies in Haiti
- Mission Rabies
