= R. E. Shope =

R. E. Shope can refer to two virologists:

- Richard Shope, influenza and papillomavirus researcher
- Robert Shope, arbovirologist and emerging infectious disease specialist
