= Duck embryo vaccine =

Vaccination against the rabies virus

Purified duck embryo vaccine (PDEV) was the first vaccine developed for human use in treating pre- and postexposure to the rabies virus. It was developed in 1957 and was made of dried, killed rabies virus. Vaccination with PDEV involved a series of intradermal injections over several days. The World Health Organization still includes PDEV in its list of recommended vaccines for treatment of rabies virus exposure. However, newer vaccines are more commonly used. These include the human diploid cell vaccine (HDCV) first introduced in 1978; purified chicken embryo cell vaccine (PCECV), developed in 1984; and a purified Vero cell rabies vaccine (PVCRV) developed in 1986.

== See also ==
- List of vaccine ingredients
- List of vaccine topics
- Reverse vaccinology
- Virosome
- Immunity
