= Cryptic rabies =

Rabies infection from unrecognized exposure

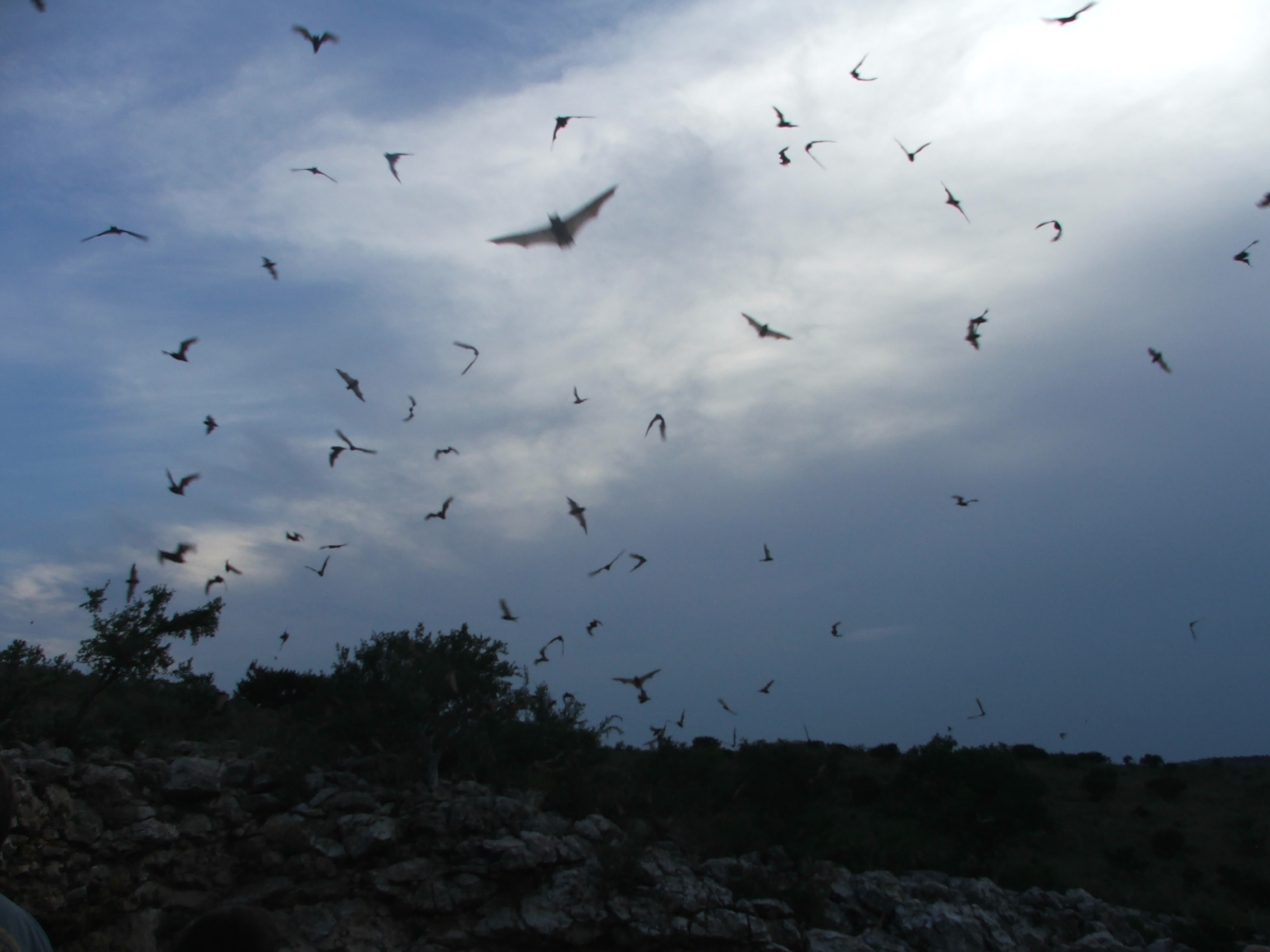
Bats outside Frio Cave in Texas. The cave is estimated to house over 20 million Mexican free-tailed bats and their young.

Cryptic rabies refers to infection from unrecognized exposure to rabies virus. It is often phylogenetically traced to bats. It is most often seen in the southern United States. Silver-haired bats (Lasionycteris noctivagans) and tricolored bats (Perimyotis subflavus) are the two most common bat species associated with this form of infection, though both species are known to have less contact with humans than other bat species such as the big brown bat. That species is common throughout the United States and often roosts in buildings and homes where human contact is more likely.

== Transmission ==
Cryptic rabies refers to instances where rabies occurs in an individual with no clear history of exposure to a rabies vector. Determining history of contact, usually via the bite of an infected animal, can be difficult if the patient is unconscious or incoherent by the time an attempt is made to collect patient history. Thus, friends and family are needed to fill in patient history of possible bite exposure. Additionally, bites from a vector can be overlooked, particularly for some small bat species. Bites from a bat can be so small that they are not visible without magnification equipment, for example. Outside of bites, rabies virus exposure can also occur if infected fluids come in contact with a mucous membrane or a break in the skin. Rabies virus has also been transmitted when an infected human unknowingly dies of rabies, and their organs are transplanted to others.

While it has been speculated that rabies virus could be transmitted through aerosols, studies of the rabies virus have concluded that this is only feasible in limited conditions. These conditions include a very large colony of bats in a hot and humid cave with poor ventilation. While two human deaths in 1956 and 1959 had been tentatively attributed to aerosolization of the rabies virus after entering a cave with bats, "investigations of the 2 reported human cases revealed that both infections could be explained by means other than aerosol transmission".

== Species specific reservoir ==
It is not well understood why most, but not all, cases of cryptic bat rabies can be traced to silver-haired bats and tricolored bats, but it is believed that the strain of rabies virus in these species is particularly virulent.
