= Stephen S. Morse =

Stephen S. Morse (born November 22, 1951) is an American epidemiologist, influenza researcher and specialist on emerging infectious diseases, who has served as an adviser on the epidemiology of infectious diseases and on improving disease early warning systems to numerous government and international organizations. As of 2016, he is Professor of Epidemiology at the Mailman School of Public Health of Columbia University. His seminal book Emerging Viruses (1993) was selected by American Scientist for its list of "100 Top Science Books of the 20th Century".

== Biography ==
=== Youth and education ===
Morse was born in New York City on November 22, 1951. He attended the Bronx High School of Science, and received a BS degree from City College of New York (1971) and MS (1974) and PhD (1977) degrees from the University of Wisconsin–Madison.

=== Career ===
Morse was formerly an assistant professor of virology at The Rockefeller University in New York and remains an adjunct faculty member there. He was chair and principal organizer of the 1989 NIAID/NIH Conference on Emerging Viruses, for which he originated the concept of “emerging viruses”/ “emerging infections.” He served as a member of the Institute of Medicine, National Academy of Sciences' Committee on Emerging Microbial Threats to Health (and chaired its Task Force on Viruses) and was a contributor to its report, Emerging Infections: Microbial Threats to Health in the United States, edited by Joshua Lederberg, Robert Shope and Stanley Oaks (1992).

Morse served on the steering committee of the Institute of Medicine's Forum on Microbial Threats, and the National Academy of Sciences' Committee on Biodefense. He was the founding chair of a nonprofit organization called ProMED (Program to Monitor Emerging Diseases) and was one of the originators of ProMED-mail, an international network inaugurated by it in 1994 for disease outbreak reporting and monitoring using the Internet. He was program manager for biodefense at the Defense Advanced Research Projects Agency (DARPA) of the Department of Defense (1996–2000), where he co-directed the pathogen countermeasures program and subsequently directed the advanced diagnostics program.

Morse returned to Columbia University in 2000, where he is professor of epidemiology, curriculum coordinator for the Center for Public Health Preparedness and co-director of the USAID PREDICT Project as well as director of the MPH Infectious Disease Epidemiology Certificate. He is also affiliated with the Center for Infectious Disease Epidemiologic Research and the National Center for Disaster Preparedness. Morse works with the New York City Department of Health and Mental Hygiene (DOHMH) on enhancing emergency preparedness and on training the public health workforce.

== Awards, accolades and positions ==
- Director, USAID PREDICT
- Fellow, American Academy of Microbiology
- Fellow, American College of Epidemiology
- Fellow, New York Academy of Sciences (and Past Chair, Microbiology Section)
- Fellow, New York Academy of Medicine
- Founding chair, ProMED (Program for Monitoring Emerging Diseases)
- Fellow, AAAS
- Life Member, Council on Foreign Relations

== Selected works ==
Books

- Morse, S.S. (Ed.) (1993). Emerging Viruses. New York and Oxford: Oxford Univ. Press.
- Morse, S.S. (Ed.) (1994). The Evolutionary Biology of Viruses. New York: Raven Press/Wolters Kluwer.

Reviews and research papers

- Morse, S.S., Schluederberg, A. "Emerging viruses: The evolution of viruses and viral diseases." J. Infect. Dis. 162: 1-7 (1990).
- Morse, S.S. "Factors in the emergence of infectious diseases." Emerging Infectious Diseases 1: 7-15 (1995).
- Morse, S.S., Rosenberg, B.H., Woodall, J. "Global monitoring of emerging diseases: design for a demonstration program." Health Policy 38: 135-153 (1996).
- Rosenfield A., Morse S.S., Yanda K. "September 11: The response and role of public health" Am J Publ Hlth 92 10-11 (2002).
- Morse SS "The vigilance defense" Scientific American 287 88-89 (2002).
- Morse SS "Building academic-practice partnerships: The Center for Public Health Preparedness at the Columbia University Mailman School of Public Health, before and after 9/11 " J Publ Jlth Mgmt Practice 9 427-432 (2003)
- Olson, D.R., Simonsen, L., Edelson, P.J., Morse, S.S. "Epidemiological evidence of an early wave of the 1918 influenza pandemic in New York City." Proc. Natl. Acad. Sci. (USA) 102: 11059-11063 (2005)
- Morse, S.S., Garwin, R.L., Olsiewski, P.J. "Next Flu Pandemic: What to Do Until the Vaccine Arrives?" Science 314: 929 (2006).
- Morse, S.S. "The U.S. pandemic influenza implementation plan at six months." Nature Medicine 13: 681-684 (2007).
- Morse, S.S. "Global infectious disease surveillance and health intelligence." Health Affairs 26: 1069-1077 (2007).
- Morse, S.S. "Pandemic influenza: Studying the lessons of history." Proc. Natl. Acad. Sci. (USA) 104: 7313-7314 (2007).
- Murray, E.J., Morse, S.S. "Seasonal oscillation of human infection with H5N1 Influenza A in Egypt and Indonesia." PLoS ONE 6(9): e24042 (2010). doi:10.1371/journal.pone.0024042.
- Morse, S.S. "Public health surveillance and infectious disease detection." Biosecurity and Bioterrorism 10(1): 6-16 (2012).
- Morse, S.S., Mazet, J.A.K., Woolhouse, M., Parrish, C.R., Carroll, D., Karesh, W.B., Zambrana-Torrelio, C., Lipkin, W.I., Daszak, P. "Prediction and prevention of the next pandemic zoonosis." Lancet 380(9857): 1956-1965 (2012).
- Anthony, S.J., Epstein, J.H., Murray, K.A., Navarrete-Macias, I., Zambrana-Torrelio, C.M., Solovyov, A., Ojeda-Flores, R., Arrigo, N.C., Islam, A., Ali Khan, S., Hosseini, P., Bogich, T.L., Olival, K.J., Sanchez-Leon, M.D., Karesh, W.B., Goldstein, T., Luby, S.P., Morse, S.S., Mazet, J.A.K., Daszak, P., Lipkin, W.I. "A strategy to estimate unknown viral diversity in mammals." mBio 4(5):e00598-13 (2013).
- González, M.C., Morse, S.S. (2013). "Global influenza surveillance: advances in technology." In: Ask the experts: influenza surveillance (J. Oxford and J.S. Taubenberger, eds.), Chapter 2. Expert Reviews/Future Science, London, UK [e-book] (2013).
- Morse, S.S. "Public health disease surveillance networks." ASM Microbiology Spectrum 1(3):OH-0002-2012. doi:10.1128/microbiolspec.OH-0002-2012 (2013).
