= Imjin virus =

Virus classification
- (unranked): Virus
- Realm: Riboviria
- Kingdom: Orthornavirae
- Phylum: Negarnaviricota
- Class: Bunyaviricetes
- Order: Elliovirales
- Family: Hantaviridae
- Genus: Thottimvirus
- Species: Thottimvirus imjinense

Synonyms
- Imjin orthohantavirus

Species of virus

Imjin virus (MJNV) is a single-stranded, enveloped, negative-sense RNA virus of the Orthohantavirus genus in the Hantaviridae family. It was isolated from the lung tissues of Ussuri white-toothed shrews of the species Crocidura lasiura (order Soricomorpha, family Soricidae, subfamily Crocidurinae) captured near the demilitarized zone in the Republic of Korea during 2004 and 2005.

== Virology ==
Phylogenetic analyses demonstrates a common ancestry with Thottapalayam virus, suggesting early evolutionary divergence. It is still unknown if MJNV is pathogenic for humans.

MJNV has been shown to be a genetically unique hantavirus. Multiple strains have been isolated from the lung tissues of Ussuri white-toothed shrews captured between 2004 and 2010. Partial M- and L-segment sequences from lung tissues of 12 of 37 (32.4%) anti-MJNV IgG antibody-positive shrews revealed that the 12 MJNV strains differed by 0–12.2% and 0–2.3% at the nucleotide and amino acid levels. A similar degree of nucleotide and amino acid difference was found in a 632-nucleotide length of the L segment of nine MJNV strains. Phylogenetic analyses demonstrated a geographic relationship similar to the phylogeography of rodent-borne hantaviruses.

== See also ==
- Sangassou virus
- Sweating sickness, which may have been caused by a hantavirus
- 1993 Four Corners hantavirus outbreak
