= Arctic rabies virus =

Virus classification
- (unranked): Virus
- Realm: Riboviria
- Kingdom: Orthornavirae
- Phylum: Negarnaviricota
- Class: Monjiviricetes
- Order: Mononegavirales
- Family: Rhabdoviridae
- Genus: Lyssavirus
- Species: Lyssavirus rabies
- Strain: Arctic rabies virus

Strain of Rabies lyssavirus that circulates throughout the arctic regions

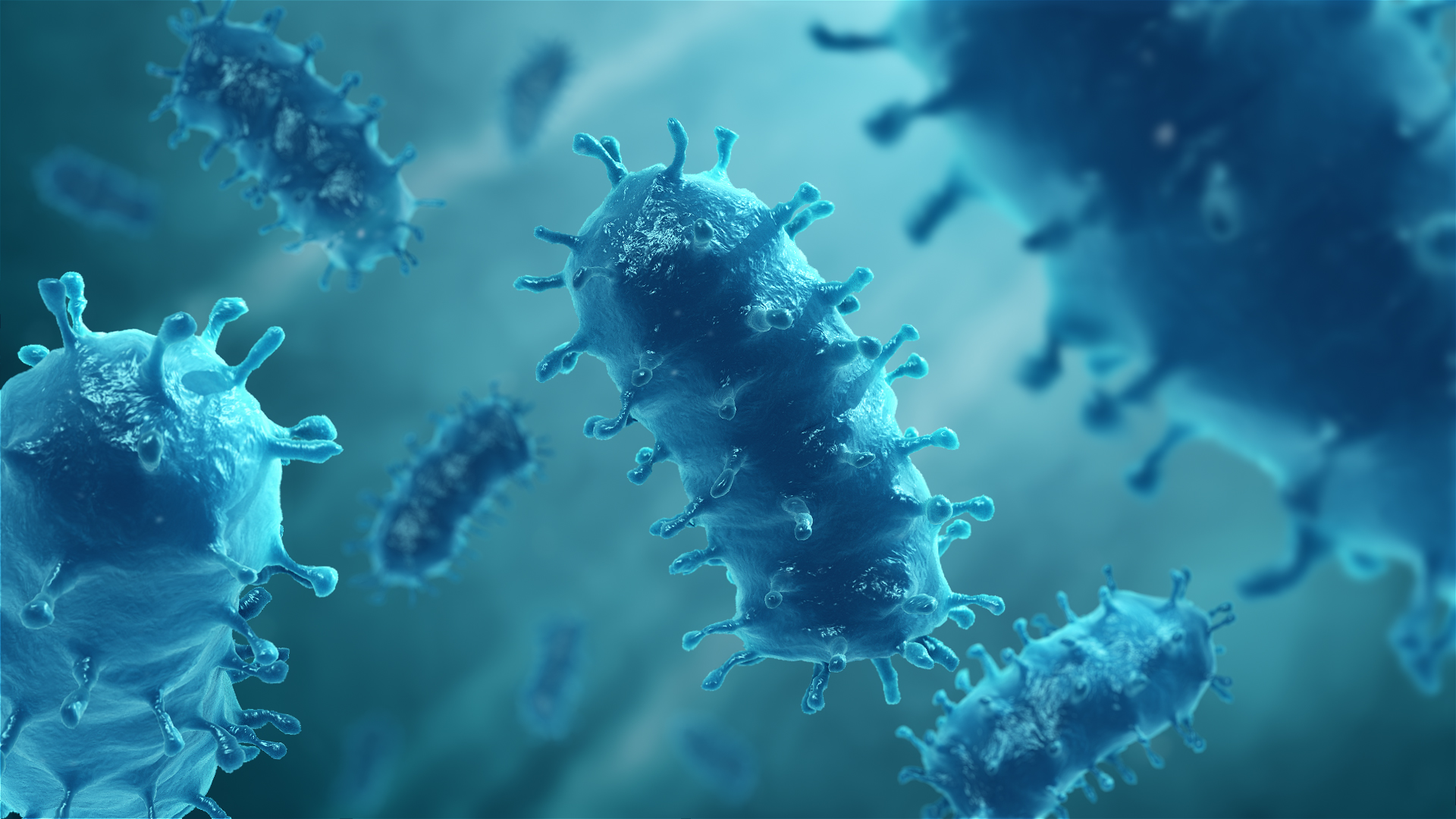
Model of Rabies virus

Arctic rabies virus is a strain of Lyssavirus rabies that circulates throughout the arctic regions of Alaska, Canada, Greenland, and Russia. There have been no cases in Sweden or mainland Norway in over 100 years. The virus is, however, found on Svalbard. No cases have been reported in Finland since 1989. The Arctic fox is the main host.

Arctic rabies virus belongs to the family Rhabdoviridae and the genus Lyssavirus. Arctic rabies virus represents one of four genotypes of rabies, all of which have been shown to adapt to different hosts which include fruit- and insect-eating bats and the Arctic fox.

== Molecular epidemiology ==
Arctic rabies viruses circulating in Arctic countries are phylogenetically related to rabies viruses in India. The Indian arctic-like rabies virus is referred to as Arctic/Arctic-like (AL) lineage. This lineage accounts for the type circulating across almost all of India. Using phylogenetic analysis and Bayesian methods, the Indian viruses emerged from a common progenitor within the last 40 years. The Arctic-AL lineage emerged within the last 200 years, a time-frame that coincides with the invasion of Canada by the clade.

== Clinical appearance ==
The incubation period for Arctic rabies virus varies from 8 days to 6 months in the Arctic fox. Observed symptoms include increased aggression (including snapping and biting), foaming at the mouth, and running in circles.
