= Thottapalayam virus =

Virus classification
- (unranked): Virus
- Realm: Riboviria
- Kingdom: Orthornavirae
- Phylum: Negarnaviricota
- Class: Bunyaviricetes
- Order: Elliovirales
- Family: Hantaviridae
- Genus: Thottimvirus
- Species: Thottimvirus thottapalayamense

Synonyms
- Thottapalayam hantavirus; Thottapalayam virus

Species of virus

Thottapalayam virus (TMPV) is single-stranded, enveloped, negative-sense RNA virus species of the genus Thottimvirus in the Hantaviridae family. It was the first hantavirus to be isolated from a shrew. It was discovered in India in 1964.

== Natural reservoir ==
TPMV was first isolated from an Asian house shrew (Suncus murinus) in India in 1964. It is part of a group of hantaviruses which are hosted by shrews instead of rodents. These shrew-borne thottimviruses are not known to cause any known disease in humans, unlike the similar and related orthohantaviruses, including Andes virus and Hantaan virus.

TPMV was first isolated in Asian house shrews in Wenzhou of Zhejiang province, China.

== Virology ==
Phylogenetic analysis has shown that Thottapalayam virus, and its closely related strains, is unique and forms a distinct lineage, unrelated to other hantaviruses. The closest hantavirus to TMPV is Imjin virus which demonstrates corresponding nucleotide sequences to TPMV as does Tanganya virus.

== See also ==
- RNA virus
- Puumala virus
