= Paul A. Lewis =

American scientist and infectious disease researcher

Paul Adin Lewis
- Born: April 14, 1879; Chicago, Illinois, US
- Died: June 30, 1929 (aged 50); Bahia, Brazil
- Education: University of Wisconsin–Milwaukee, University of Pennsylvania
- Known for: Research on the Spanish flu
- Scientific career
- Fields: Pathology, bacteriology, virology
- Workplaces: University of Pennsylvania; Rockefeller University

Paul Adin Lewis (April 14, 1879 – June 30, 1929) was an American pathologist and associate member of the Rockefeller Institute for Medical Research. He was best known for his work in viral and bacterial pathology.

== Personal life ==
Lewis was born in Chicago and grew up in Milwaukee, Wisconsin. He was the eldest son of Dr. Clinton H. Lewis, a practicing physician. Lewis's sister, Dr. Marian Lewis, also practiced medicine in Milwaukee.

Lewis married Louise Durbin in 1906. They had two children, Hobart and Janet.

== Education and career ==
After attending the University of Wisconsin–Milwaukee, Lewis went on to earn his M.D. from the University of Pennsylvania in 1904. While still an undergraduate, he chose to pursue a career as a laboratory scientist and never practiced medicine.

Following stints at Boston City Hospital, the Massachusetts State Board of Health, Harvard University, and the Rockefeller Institute for Medical Research, Lewis became laboratory director at the Henry Phipps Institute and professor of experimental pathology at the University of Pennsylvania (1910–1923). He served in the U.S. Naval Reserve (1917–1921), attaining the rank of commander, and served during the 1918–19 Spanish flu pandemic. Lewis rejoined the Rockefeller Institute in Princeton, New Jersey, in 1923 and worked in the department of animal pathology until his death six years later.

== Scientific contributions ==
From his graduation in 1904 to his death in 1929, Lewis published 78 articles on topics such as anaphylaxis, poliomyelitis, chemotherapy, and tuberculosis. With Simon Flexner in 1910, Lewis discovered via a series of experiments that poliomyelitis is caused by a virus, the virus can be transmitted between monkeys, and exposure makes survivors immune to reinfection. These discoveries helped pave the way for development of a polio vaccine in 1955. With Richard E. Shope in 1931, Lewis discovered an influenza A virus that could infect both pigs and humans. This virus turned deadly when co-infected with Haemophilus influenzae, illuminating the origins of the Spanish flu. Lewis's later work centered on tuberculosis, heredity, and allergies in guinea pigs. Lewis served as director of the National Tuberculosis Association and member of the American Association of Pathologists and Bacteriologists, Association of American Physicians, and American Association for the Advancement of Science.

== Death ==
In 1929, Lewis died of yellow fever in Bahia, Brazil, while investigating the disease under the auspices of the Rockefeller Foundation's International Health Board. A telegram reporting his death to the Foundation noted that Lewis probably contracted yellow fever through a laboratory infection. Shope, who was mentored by Lewis at the Rockefeller Institute, noted to family a rumor that his mentor had somehow contaminated a cigarette with the virus entering through a cut on Lewis's lip. This theory of Lewis's untimely death mirrored some of the details of the Pulitzer Prize-winning novel Arrowsmith by Sinclair Lewis published several years earlier in 1925.

Lewis is interred at the Forest Hills Cemetery in Madison, Wisconsin. The Lewis Playfield in Milwaukee's Bay View neighborhood is named in his honor.
