= Richard Shope =

American physician

Richard Edwin Shope
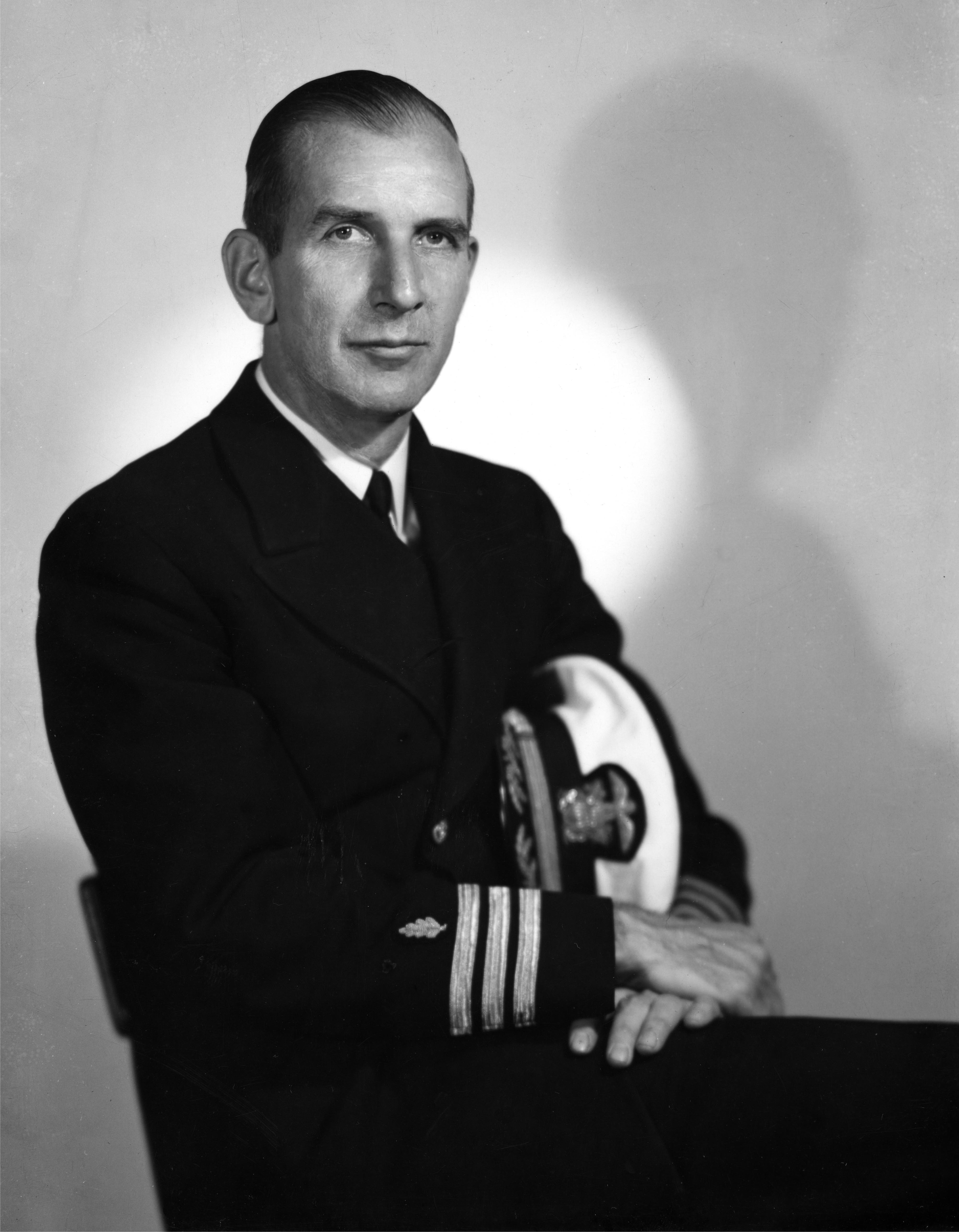
- Richard Edwin Shope as a U.S. Navy officer
- Born: December 25, 1901; Des Moines, Iowa, United States
- Died: October 2, 1966 (aged 64)
- Education: University of Iowa
- Known for: Identified Shope papilloma virus and main cause of 1918 pandemic as Influenza A virus
- Spouse: Helen Ellis
- Children: 4
- Awards: 1957 Kober medal; 1957 Albert Lasker Clinical Medical Research Award; U.S. Army Legion of Merit
- Scientific career
- Fields: Virologist
- Workplaces: Rockefeller University; National Naval Medical Center
- Academic advisors: Dr. Paul Lewis

Richard Edwin Shope (December 25, 1901 – October 2, 1966) was an American virologist who, together with his mentor Paul A. Lewis at the Rockefeller Institute, identified influenzavirus A in pigs in 1931. Using Shope's technique, Smith, Andrewes, and Laidlaw of England's Medical Research Council cultured it from a human in 1933. They and Shope in 1935 and 1936, respectively, identified it as the virus circulating in the 1918 pandemic. In 1933, Shope identified the Shope papilloma virus, which infects rabbits. His discovery later assisted other researchers to link the papilloma virus to warts and cervical cancer. He received the 1957 Albert Lasker Clinical Medical Research Award and was an elected member of the United States National Academy of Sciences, the American Philosophical Society, and the American Academy of Arts and Sciences.

== Career ==
In 1931 Shope worked as a researcher and together with Paul A. Lewis at Rockefeller University discovered that the cause of swine flu was virtually identical to bacillus influenza, a bacterium that had in 1892 been identified as the cause for human influenza. Shope and Lewis went on to identify a virus that also had links to influenza, putting into doubt the thesis that flu was caused by a bacterial infection. Soon after this controversial discovery, Lewis traveled to Brazil to study an outbreak of yellow fever. The 28 year old Shope had put himself forward for this research trip, but his offer was refused by Lewis. Instead Shope continued to research swine flu. Lewis did not return from the research trip, as he died of a yellow fever infection brought about by a laboratory accident.

Shope continued his work at the Department of Animal Pathology at the Rockefeller Institute for Medical Research in Princeton, New Jersey. In 1933 Wilson Smith, Christopher Andrewes, and Patrick Laidlaw isolated the influenza virus. In 1935 Shope found that humans that had been alive during the 1918-1919 swine flu epidemic still carried antibodies against the swine flu virus. Throughout the 1930s Shope continued to research swine flu. While studying swine flu on farms in Iowa Shope discovered that virus infections caused the mad itch, also known as pseudorabies, in cattle. Shope also discovered that virus infection caused fibroma in the cottontail rabbits he had hunted in New Jersey, and that a virus infection was also responsible for the papillomatosis in the cottontail rabbits he had observed in Iowa. By the late 1930s Shope had established himself as a well-known expert with a reputation as a virus hunter.

Shope left the Rockefeller Institute to join a research team the Canadian Department of National Defence and the US War Department established to investigate rinderpest. The research team was based in Canada, but Shope could not commence research at the speed he was accustomed to, as he was also in active service as Commander in the US Naval Reserve. In 1943 Shope presented his team's research on rinderpest at a meeting hosted by George Merck.

== Family ==
His son Robert Shope was also a virologist, who specialised in arthropod-borne viruses.
