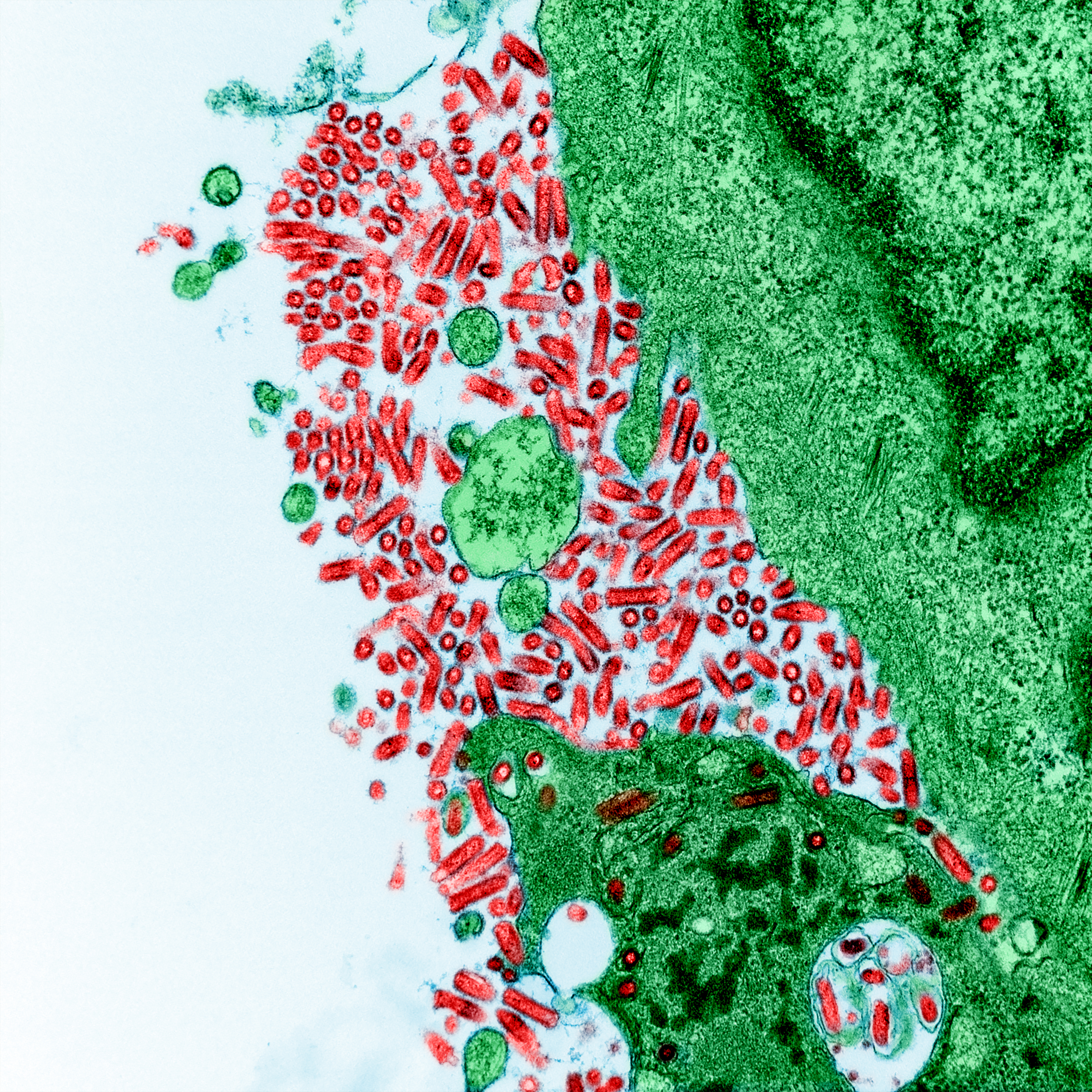
- Colorized transmission electron micrograph showing the rabies virus (in red) infecting cultured cells

Virus classification
- (unranked): Virus
- Realm: Riboviria
- Kingdom: Orthornavirae
- Phylum: Negarnaviricota
- Class: Monjiviricetes
- Order: Mononegavirales
- Family: Rhabdoviridae
- Genus: Lyssavirus
- Species: Lyssavirus rabies

Member viruses
- Rabies virus; Arctic rabies virus

Synonyms
- Rabies lyssavirus

= Rabies virus =

Species of virus

Rabies virus (Lyssavirus rabies) is a neurotropic virus that causes rabies in animals, including humans. It can cause violence, hydrophobia, and fever. Rabies transmission often occurs through the saliva of animals and less commonly through contact with human saliva. Rabies virus, like many rhabdoviruses, has an extremely wide host range. In the wild it has been found infecting many mammalian species, while in the laboratory it has been found that birds can be infected, as well as cell cultures from mammals, birds, reptiles and insects. Rabies is reported in more than 150 countries and on all continents except Antarctica. The main burden of disease is reported in Asia and Africa, but some cases have been reported also in Europe in the past 10 years, especially in returning travellers.

Rabies virus has a cylindrical morphology and is a member of the Lyssavirus genus of the Rhabdoviridae family. These viruses are enveloped and have a single stranded RNA genome with negative-sense. The genetic information is packaged as a ribonucleoprotein complex in which RNA is tightly bound by the viral nucleoprotein. The RNA genome of the virus encodes five genes whose order is highly conserved. These genes code for nucleoprotein (N), phosphoprotein (P), matrix protein (M), glycoprotein (G) and the viral RNA polymerase (L). The complete genome sequences range from 11,615 to 11,966 nt in length.

Rabies lyssavirus has a "negative polarity" (or is a negative-sense RNA virus 3'-5'), which means that its genetic material cannot be directly translated into proteins by the host cell's machinery. Once inside the cytoplasm of a cell, the viral polymerase uses the negative strand as a template to create positive-sense messenger RNA (mRNA) strands. These mRNAs are then translated by the host cell to make proteins, and later to replicate the viral genome. All transcription and replication events take place in the cytoplasm inside a specialized "virus factory", the Negri body (named after Adelchi Negri). These are 2–10 μm in diameter and are typical for a rabies infection and thus have been used as definite histological proof of such infection.

== Structure ==
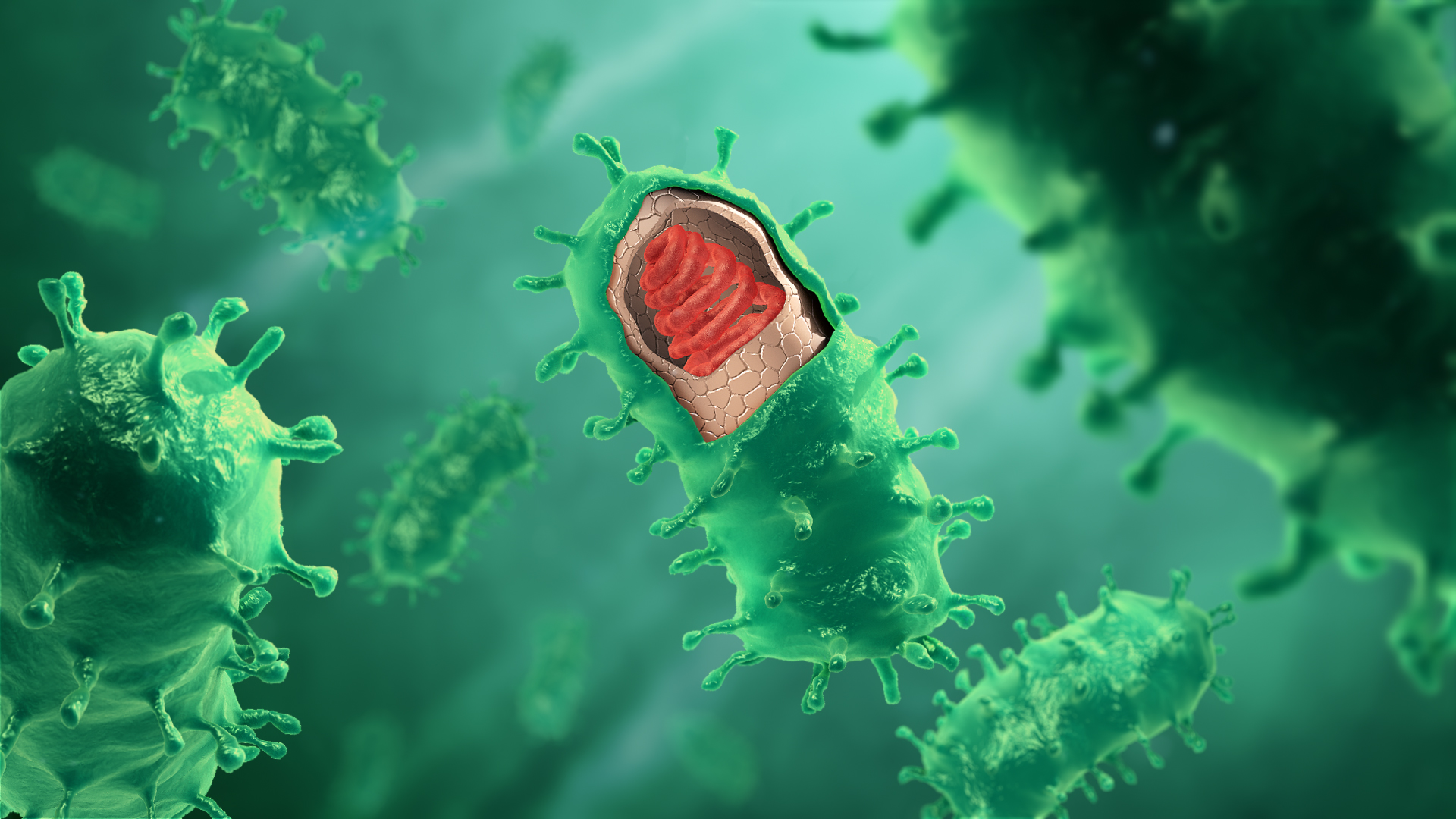
3D still showing rabies virus structure.

Rhabdoviruses have helical symmetry, so their infectious particles are approximately cylindrical in shape. They are characterized by an extremely broad host spectrum ranging from birds to mammals; human-infecting viruses more commonly have icosahedral symmetry and take shapes approximating regular polyhedra.

The rabies genome encodes five proteins: nucleoprotein (N), phosphoprotein (P), matrix protein (M), glycoprotein (G) and polymerase (L). All rhabdoviruses have two major structural components: a helical ribonucleoprotein core (RNP) and a surrounding envelope. In the RNP, genomic RNA is tightly encased by the nucleoprotein. Two other viral proteins, the phosphoprotein and the large protein (L-protein or polymerase) are associated with the RNP. The glycoprotein forms approximately 400 trimeric spikes which are tightly arranged on the surface of the virus. The M protein is associated both with the envelope and the RNP and may be the central protein of rhabdovirus assembly.

Rabies virus has a bullet-like shape with a length of about 180 nm and a cross-sectional diameter of about 75 nm. One end is rounded or conical and the other end is planar or concave. The lipoprotein envelope carries knob-like spikes composed of Glycoprotein G. Spikes do not cover the planar end of the virion (virus particle). Beneath the envelope is the membrane or matrix (M) protein layer which may be invaginated at the planar end. The core of the virion consists of helically arranged ribonucleoprotein.

== Genome organization ==
The rhabdovirus virion is an enveloped, rod- or bullet-shaped structure containing five protein species:

- The nucleoprotein (N) coats the RNA at the rate of one monomer of protein to nine nucleotides, forming a nucleocapsid with helical symmetry. Associated with the nucleocapsid are copies of P (phosphoprotein) and L (large) protein.
- The L protein is well named, its gene taking up about half of the genome. Its large size is justified by the fact that it is a multifunctional protein.
- The M (matrix) protein forms a layer between the nucleocapsid and the envelope
- Trimers of G (glycoprotein) form spikes that protrude from the envelope.

The genomes of most rhabdoviruses possess the five genes encoding these proteins, as in the case of Rhabdovirus lyssae.

=== Proteins ===
List of rabies virus ORFs (3′ to 5′)
Symbol	Name	UniProt	Function
N	Nucleoprotein	P16285	Coats the RNA.
P	Phosphoprotein	P16286	L cofactor and various regulatory functions. Has many isoforms from multiple initiation.
M	Matrix	P16287	Keeps nucleoprotein condensed. Important for assembly; has roles in regulation.
G	Glycoprotein	P16288	Spike. Uses muscular nAChR, NCAM, and p75NTR as receptors.
L	Large structural protein	P16289	RNA replicase of the Mononegavirales type.

Rabies virus is estimated to cause around 55,000 deaths per year across the world and has a death rate of nearly 100%. These statistics coupled with the fact that there is currently no specific treatment, or antiviral drug makes research on the virus of vital importance for the scientific community in order to possibly lower the current death rate. The rabies virus phosphoprotein and polymerase are both important targets for antivirals and are currently used to create the vaccine used for domestic and wild animals. A lot of research is being done to better understand the specific roles and functions of the L-P protein because there is significant evidence already that it could be one of the most important proteins to target for future drugs.

There are five proteins that are coded for by the rabies virus genome—phosphoprotein (P), polymerase (L), matrix protein (M), nucleoprotein (N), and glycoprotein (G). These five proteins are transcribed into mRNA in different quantities. The protein transcribed the most is the nucleoprotein, then the phosphoprotein, then the matrix protein, then the glycoprotein and finally the polymerase. Of those proteins, the ones that may be the most important for the functions of the virus are the L-P protein complex. These two proteins are required for the production of all of the proteins utilized by the rabies virus and they interact with many of the other proteins to complete the functions needed by the virus to infect cells, replicate and complete other vital functions. When the structure of the L-P protein was analyzed using UCSF Chimera, it was found that it contained two zinc molecules as well as 2 five-membered rings. The secondary structures were also analyzed, and it was found that there were three different kinds-coil, helix and strand.

==== Phosphoprotein ====
The phosphoprotein (P) consists of 297 amino acids, has a total mass of 33 k-Da and is a type I interferon antagonist. It is in a viral ribonucleoprotein made up of RNA surrounded by nucleoproteins (N), which form a structure that is ring-like. Each nucleoprotein surrounds nine nucleotides of the RNA and the nucleoproteins in conjunction with the phosphoprotein are important for initiating synthesis of the RNA. The phosphoprotein is largely responsible for preventing the immune system from destroying the virus before it can take hold. It has been found that it stops production of interferons by disrupting the interferon regulatory factor-3 (IRF-3) and, therefore, prevents the normal function of the interferons, which allows it to continue to infect the host. The phosphoprotein is also very important for replication. It is a required cofactor of the viral polymerase (L) and is also a chaperone for the nucleoprotein (N), which is responsible for the encapsidation of viral RNA. It is thought that the P protein consists of only a few repeating units.

==== Large structural protein (polymerase) ====
The polymerase (L) consists of 2,127 amino acids, has a total mass of 242 k-Da and interacts with the phosphoprotein to form the RNA-dependent RNA polymerase complex. L and P bind to each other and according to current research, the major L binding site is somewhere in the first 19 residues of the P protein. Other research found that the amino acid sequence numbered 1929 to 1933 is the sequence that is important for the L protein to bind with the P protein. It has been found that the L protein initiates synthesis and works optimally if it works together with the P protein. The region from 1900 to 1930, which contains part of the sequence that is important for L and P protein binding, and the region from 1870 to 1890 are hydrophilic regions and are also highly conserved among rabies virus strains. The 1929 to 1933 sequence is also of importance because it is involved with RNA synthesis of the virus and thus could possibly be a target for new drugs. The carboxy-terminal domain of L must be present in order for L to bind to P. The L protein also has a catalytic center while the P protein is believed to not have a catalytic center. There is evidence that for the rabies virus, the L protein can be expressed even if the P protein is not expressed. This is different from many other related viruses, which require both to be expressed and present. One of the domains in the L protein is responsible for speeding up the reaction that results in the capping of the RNA and thus could possibly be another good target for an antiviral drug. The nucleoproteins (N), which it was previously mentioned aid the P protein, also interact with the L protein and this is necessary for initiation. The interactions between the L protein and the M protein have also been noted to be of importance to its function. Research has shown that there are interactions between the two proteins in relation to the balance of transcription and translation. The polymerase is an enzyme and can aid in initiation, elongation, capping, methylation, polyadenylation and RNA polymerization.

== Life cycle ==
After receptor binding, Rabies virus enters its host cells through the endosomal transport pathway. Inside the endosome, the low pH value induces the membrane fusion process, thus enabling the viral genome to reach the cytosol. Both processes, receptor binding and membrane fusion, are catalyzed by the glycoprotein G which plays a critical role in pathogenesis (mutant virus without G proteins cannot propagate).

The next step after its entry is the transcription of the viral genome by the P-L polymerase (P is an essential cofactor for the L polymerase) in order to make new viral protein. The viral polymerase can only recognize ribonucleoprotein and cannot use free RNA as template. Transcription is regulated by cis-acting sequences on the virus genome and by protein M which is not only essential for virus budding but also regulates the fraction of mRNA production to replication. Later in infection, the activity of the polymerase switches to replication in order to produce full-length positive-strand RNA copies. These complementary RNAs are used as templates to make new negative-strand RNA genomes. They are packaged together with protein N to form ribonucleoprotein which then can form new viruses.

== Infection ==
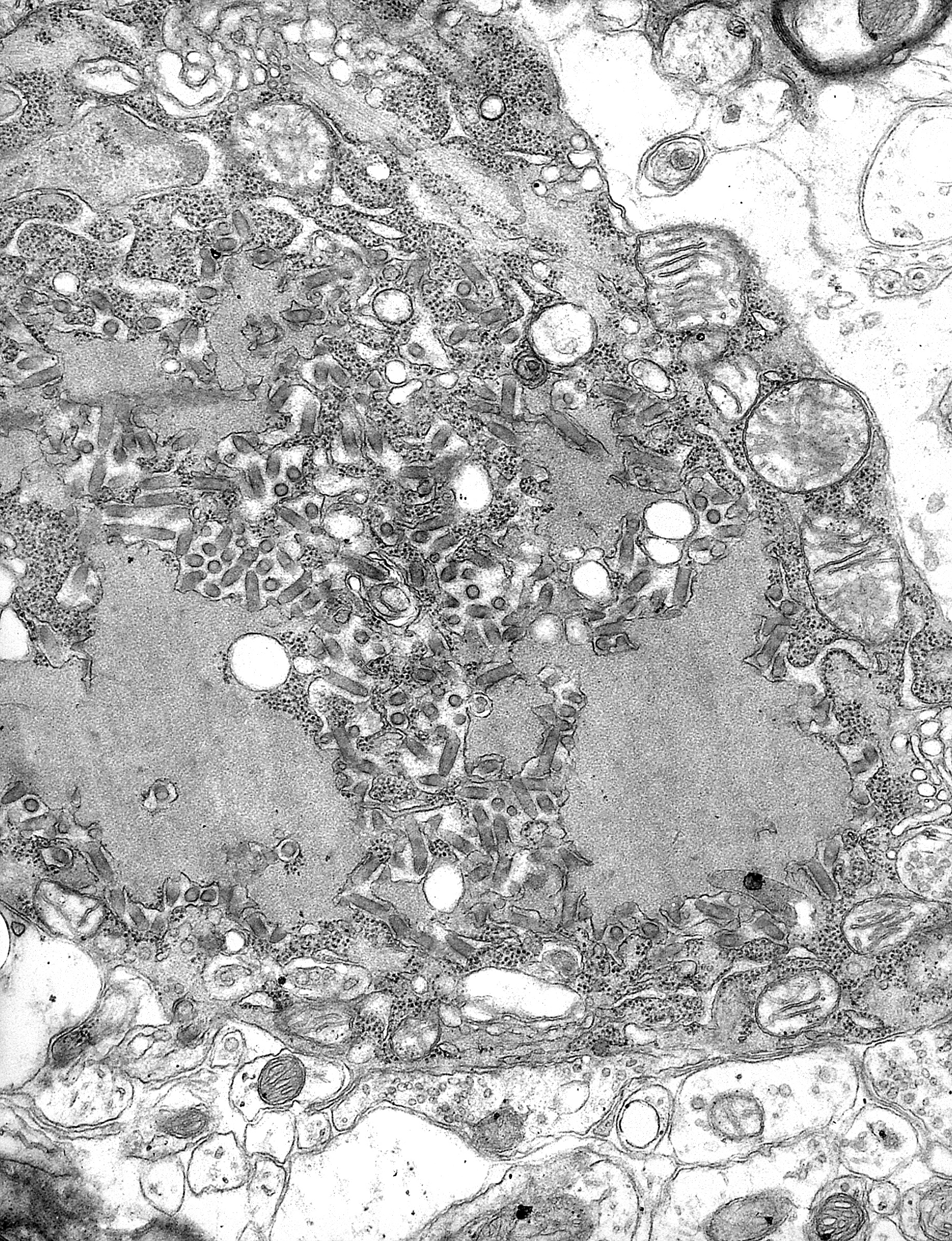
TEM micrograph with numerous rabies virions (small dark-grey rod-like particles) and Negri bodies (the larger pathognomonic cellular inclusions of rabies infection)

In September 1931, Joseph Lennox Pawan of Trinidad found Negri bodies in the brain of a bat with unusual habits. In 1932, Pawan first discovered that infected vampire bats could transmit rabies to humans and other animals.

Rabies virus initially replicates in muscle tissue following a bite before entering neurons through their nerve endings and spreading to the nervous system. The retrograde axonal transport of Rabies virus to the central nervous system (CNS) is the key step of pathogenesis during natural infection. The exact molecular mechanism of this transport is unknown although binding of the P protein from Rabies virus to the dynein light chain protein DYNLL1 has been shown. P also acts as an interferon antagonist, thus decreasing the immune response of the host.

From the CNS, the virus further spreads to other organs. The salivary glands located in the tissues of the mouth and cheeks receive high concentrations of the virus, thus allowing it to be further transmitted due to projectile salivation. Fatality can occur from two days to five years from the time of initial infection. This however depends largely on the species of animal acting as a reservoir. Most infected mammals die within weeks, while strains of a species such as the African yellow mongoose (Cynictis penicillata) might survive an infection asymptomatically for years.

== Signs and symptoms ==
The first symptoms of rabies may be very similar to those of the flu, including general weakness or discomfort, fever, or headache. These symptoms may last for days. There may be also discomfort or a prickling or itching sensation at the site of bite, progressing within days to symptoms of cerebral dysfunction, anxiety, confusion, and agitation. At the onset of these progressive symptoms, the disease begins to worsen. As the disease progresses, the person may experience delirium, abnormal behavior, hallucinations, and insomnia. Rabies virus may also be inactive in its host's body and become active after a long period of time.

The incubation period for this virus, in some cases, can last anywhere from weeks to months. This does not depend on specific form of the virus. This long incubation period is most likely due to the presence of microRNA, which slow down viral replication in the muscles. However, when the patient starts to exhibit prodromal symptoms (fever, flu) and gastrointestinal symptoms, the virus has widely spread. Prodromal symptoms are noted within the first 2–10 days after incubation and include fever and fatigue. They can also involve the respiratory system, causing sore throat and cough, the gastrointestinal system, causing anorexia, nausea, vomiting, abdominal pain, diarrhea, and central nervous system. The central nervous system is the most prevalent in some cases and includes symptoms like headache, vertigo, anxiety, nightmares, depression, and more. The neurological dysfunction starts when the central nervous system begins to slow and not function properly.

Despite hydrophobia being one of the most well-known symptoms, rabies does not cause a fear of water specifically. It causes painful spasms of throat muscles that cause swallowing water to become painful, and damage to the brain prevents the patient from differentiating between water and pain, leading to a fear of water that is more akin to a fear of swallowing. Rabies can also cause anemophobia.

== Classification and antigenic types ==
The Lyssavirus genome includes a variety of viruses ranging from the rabies virus to genetically and anti-genetically rabies-like related viruses. These viruses include Lagos Bat, Mokola, and Duvenhage viruses, as well as European bat viruses. Through other anti-genetic characterization, over 350 rabies viruses of just the Americas were discovered. Four phylogenetic groups were associated with these viruses. Additionally, other areas of ciruculation for the virus, such as E. fuscus, were found through this discovery. Although these viruses are from the same genome, cross-protection studies show that animals that had taken the Lyssavirus vaccine for traditional rabies were not fully protected when exposed to other types of Lyssavirus.

This leads to different categorization of these Rabies viruses. A fixed classification denotes that the virus was adapted by passage in animals or cell culture. Wild type classification, more generally known as street type, implies the virus was adapted through other means, such as a bite. To differentiate street rabies variants, monoclonal antibodies identified origins in host reservoirs throughout the world. This suggested sources of exposure even when the bite was missing from patient history.

== Antigenicity ==
Upon viral entry into the body and also after vaccination, the body produces virus neutralizing antibodies which bind and inactivate the virus. Specific regions of the G protein have been shown to be most antigenic in leading to the production of virus neutralizing antibodies. These antigenic sites, or epitopes, are categorized into regions I–IV and minor site a. Previous work has demonstrated that antigenic sites II and III are most commonly targeted by natural neutralizing antibodies. Additionally, a monoclonal antibody with neutralizing functionality has been demonstrated to target antigenic site I. Other proteins, such as the nucleoprotein, have been shown to be unable to elicit production of virus neutralizing antibodies. The epitopes which bind neutralizing antibodies are both linear and conformational.

== Evolution ==
All extant rabies viruses appear to have evolved within the last 1,500 years. This means that the virus or viruses that caused rabies 4,000 years ago when the disease was first documented, are now extinct. There are seven genotypes of rabies virus. In Eurasia, cases are due to three of these: genotype 1 (classical rabies) and to a lesser extent genotypes 5 and 6 (European bat lyssaviruses type-1 and -2). Genotype 1 evolved in Europe in the 17th century and spread to Asia, Africa, and the Americas as a result of European exploration and colonization.

Bat rabies in North America appears to have been present since 1281 AD (95% confidence interval: 906–1577 AD).

The rabies virus appears to have undergone an evolutionary shift in hosts from Chiroptera (bats) to a species of Carnivora (i.e. raccoon or skunk) as a result of a homologous recombination event that occurred hundreds of years ago. This recombination event altered the gene that encodes the virus glycoprotein that is necessary for receptor recognition and binding.

== Application ==
Rabies virus is used in research for viral neuronal tracing to establish synaptic connections and directionality of synaptic transmission.

Recent research is focused on stabilizing the trimeric pre-fusion form of the rabies virus glycoprotein (RABV-G), which is the most immunogenic conformation of the protein. Mutations like H270P and H261L enhance the stability of this form, making it a more effective immunogen. This approach aims to develop vaccines that are both more cost-effective and have better protective coverage, addressing the ongoing global need for rabies prevention.

Interestingly, the rabies virus vaccine that was created using the SAD-B19 complex, which includes the L-P protein, was utilized in the creation of a vaccine for SARS-CoV-2. The S1 protein from SARS-CoV-2 was inserted into the rabies virus vaccine vector to create a new vaccine that was shown to be effective in protecting against COVID-19. Rabies virus has also been used to create a vaccine against Ebola, called FiloRab1, and it was found to be 100% effective for nonhuman primates.

== See also ==
- Cryptic bat rabies
- Rabies vaccine
- Duck embryo vaccine
- Arctic rabies virus
- Bat-borne virus
