= Émile Marchoux =

French physician and biologist

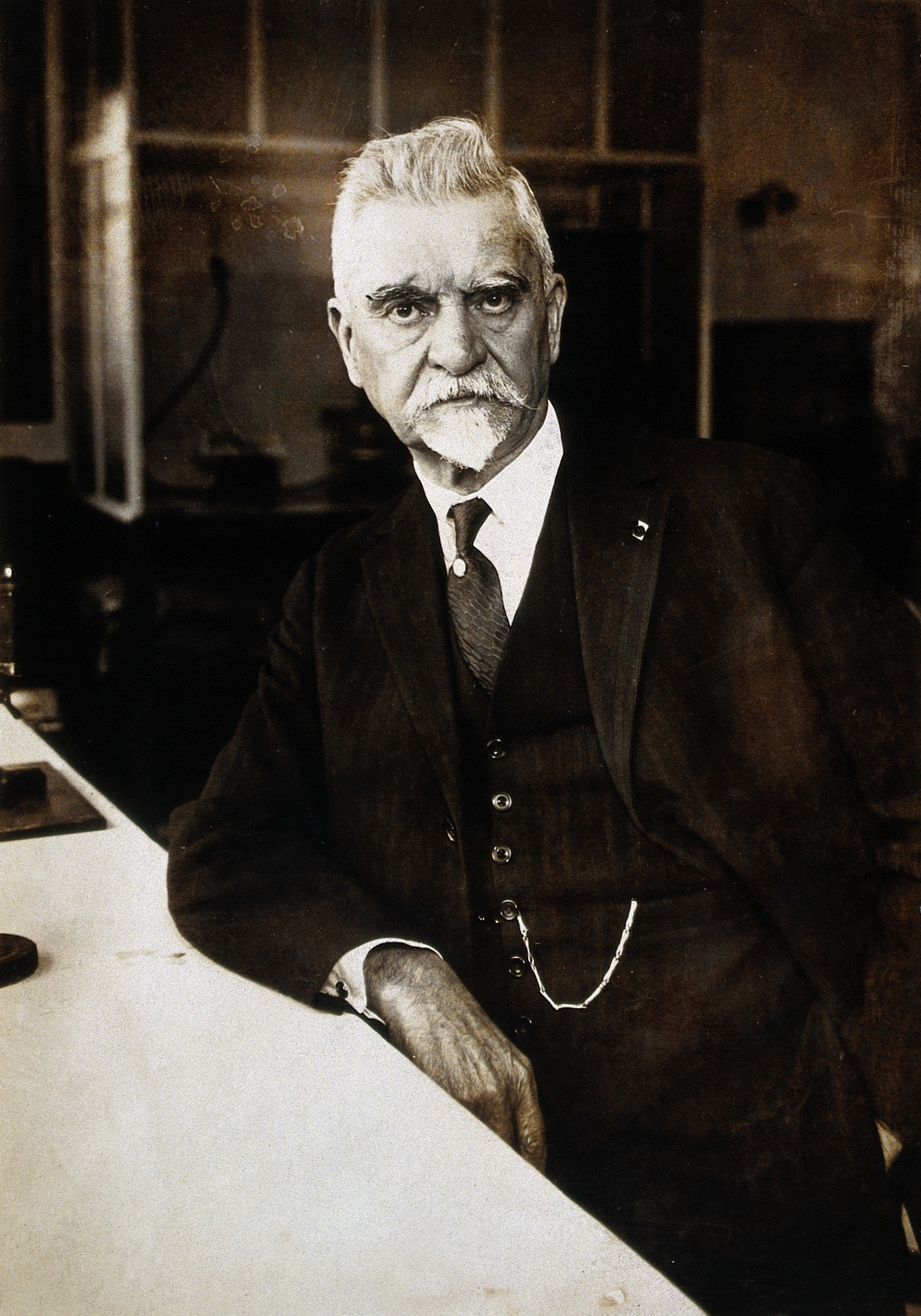
Émile Marchoux

Émile Marchoux (24 March 1862 – 19 August 1943) was a French physician and biologist born in Saint-Amant-de-Boixe, Charente.

He studied medicine in Paris, defending his doctorate with a dissertation titled Histoire des épidémies de fièvre typhoïde dans les troupes de marine à Lorient (1887). From 1888 to 1900 he served as a naval doctor in Dahomey, afterwards being responsible for vaccination services in Cochin (1890–1893). In 1893 he began taking microbiology classes at the Pasteur Institute in Paris, where he studied the anthrax bacterium in the laboratory of Emile Roux (1853–1933). From 1895 he was based in Saint-Louis, Senegal, where he established a laboratory of microbiology, subsequently dealing with an epidemic involving amoebic dysentery. During his stay in Senegal he published an influential account of malaria that was published in the Annales de l'Institut Pasteur (1897).

From 1901 to 1905, Marchoux worked with Paul-Louis Simond (1858–1947) and Alexandre Salimbeni (1867–1942) in Brazil researching yellow fever. Here the three scientists were successful in eradicating the yellow fever epidemic from Rio de Janeiro. With Salimbeni, he conducted a detailed study of avian spirochaetosis, providing a description on its mode of transmission.

In 1905 he was appointed head of "tropical microbiology" at the Pasteur Institute, and in 1908 he was co-founder of the Société de pathologie exotique with Alphonse Laveran (1845–1922) and Félix Mesnil (1868–1938). In 1922 he was named chairman of the "malaria commission" to the Société de pathologie exotique.

Marchoux is remembered today for providing prophylaxis and humanitarian treatment in his dealings with leprosy and those with the disease. In 1919 he organized under the aegis of the Pavillon colonial de l'Institut Pasteur, a counseling service for tropical diseases, with a special service reserved for people with leprosy. In 1931 with F. Sorel he founded the Institut Central de la Lèpre in Bamako, renamed the Institut Marchoux de Bamako in his honor following his death. In 1923 at Strasbourg he was elected chair of the International Leprosy Congress, afterwards being named president of the International Association of Leprosy.

In 1907 he was co-author of the treatise Hygiène coloniale, which was included in the Traité d'hygiène of Paul Brouardel (1837-1906) and Ernest Mosny (1861–1918). In 1910 he became a member of the Société de biologie, and from 1914 to 1918 was chief medical officer of the Paris Health Department.
