= Camille Delezenne =

French biologist

- Born: 6 October 1868; Genech
- Died: 7 July 1932; Paris
- Awards: Officer of the Legion of Honor

Camille Delezenne (6 October 1868 – 7 July 1932) was a French physician and biologist born in Genech, a town in the department of Nord.

He studied medicine in Lille, obtaining his hospital internship in 1890. In 1892 he supported his doctorate with a dissertation on parapneumonic pleurisy. Afterwards he undertook experiments on blood circulation at the Wertheimer laboratory in Lille. During this time period, he also served as mayor of Genech (1893–95).

In 1896 he was appointed associate professor of physiology at the University of Montpellier. At Edouard Hédon's laboratory he conducted systematic investigations of blood coagulation in vertebrates, demonstrating the hepatic origin of antithrombin and describing the blood coagulation system of birds.

In 1900 he relocated to Paris, where he worked as a lecturer in the laboratory of physiological chemistry at the École des hautes etudes. With assistance from Emile Duclaux (1840–1904) and Elie Metchnikoff (1845–1916), he was appointed head of the physiology laboratory at the Pasteur Institute, where his primary focus was research of enzymes, venoms and toxins. In 1902 he demonstrated a link between the action of enterokinase in mobilizing pancreatic digestive enzymes and the phenomena of hemolysis. He also showed that certain microbial cultures, snake venoms, and some plants and poisonous mushrooms have diastases that act on the pancreatic juice in the same way as does enterokinase.

In 1902 Delezenne became a member of the Société de biologie, in 1903 he was co-founder of the Bulletin de l'Institut Pasteur with Amédée Borrel (1867–1936), Félix Mesnil (1868–1938), Gabriel Bertrand (1867–1962), Alexandre Besredka (1870–1940) and Auguste-Charles Marie (1864–1935), and in 1910 became a professor at the Pasteur Institute. In 1912 he was elected as a member of the Académie Nationale de Médecine, and in 1929 became a member of the Assemblée de l'Institut Pasteur.
