= Alexandre Besredka =

Ukrainian-French biologist (1870–1940)

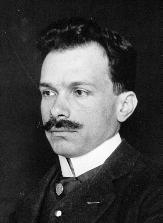
Alexandre Besredka

Alexandre Mikhailovich Besredka (29 March 1870 – 28 February 1940) was a Ukrainian-French biologist and immunologist born in Odessa. In 1910 he became a citizen of France.

He studied biology in Odessa (1888–92), afterwards moving to Paris, where he was an assistant to Ilya Ilyich Metchnikov (1845–1916) at the Pasteur Institute. He obtained his medical degree in 1897 with the thesis Abscès sous-phréniques. In 1903 with Amédée Borrel (1867–1936), Félix Mesnil (1868–1938), Gabriel Bertrand (1867–1962), Camille Delezenne (1868–1932) and Auguste-Charles Marie (1864–1935), he co-founded the Bulletin de l'Institut Pasteur. From 1905 to 1914 he was in charge of the laboratory at the Pasteur Institute.

In 1910, he attained the title of professor and for several years worked with Metchnikoff conducting experiments of typhoid fever on chimpanzees. During World War I, he served as a medical officer at Verdun and Bar-le-Duc. From 1919, he focused on studies of immunity involving intestinal infections.

Besredka specialised in research of immunology, cellular self-defense mechanisms and phagocytosis. During his career at the Pasteur Institute, he made contributions in his work involving antiviral therapy, as well as in the development of vaccines against various infectious diseases. He is best known for his research of anaphylaxis. His name is associated with "Besredka's method", a type of vaccination he proposed for avoiding anaphylactic shock in the usage of serotherapy (sometimes referred to as "Besredka's desensitization"). He was involved in the development of vaccines (plague, cholera, diarrhoea, typhoid, paratyphoid, anthrax), worked on antiviral therapy (introduced the term ‘antivirus’ in 1923). Together with Richard Pfeiffer, he was a pioneer in the study of endotoxins and was the first to show that they could be neutralised using antibodies.

In 1932, Besredka was admitted as a member of the German National Academy of Sciences Leopoldina, chaired by the Swiss physiologist and chemist Emil Abderhalden.

He was awarded the Cross of the Legion of Honour.

== Selected writings ==
- Anaphylaxie et antianaphylaxie Paris, 1918; – Anaphylaxis and anti-anaphylaxis
- Histoire d'une idée. L'oeuvre de Metschnikoff Paris, 1921.— On the work of Ilya Metchnikoff.
- De la vaccination par voie buccale contre la dysenterie, la fièvre typhoide et le cholera. Revue d'hygiène et de médecine préventive, 1927; 49: 445–463.
- Le chic anaphylactique et le principe de la desensibilisation. Paris, 1930.
- Antivirusthérapie Paris, Masson, 1930; (translated into German).—Treatise on antivirus therapy.
