= Alexandre Salimbeni =

Italian physician and biologist

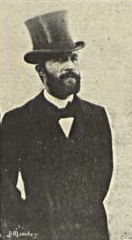
Salimbeni during the 1899 plague epidemic in Porto, Portugal

Alexandre Salimbeni (11 December 1867 - 1942) was an Italian physician and biologist born in Acquapendente.

He studied medicine at the University of Siena, where he later became a professor of pathological anatomy. From 1895 he performed studies in the laboratory of Elie Metchnikoff (1845-1916) at the Pasteur Institute in Paris, where he worked closely with Jules Bordet (1870-1961). In 1900 he served as préparateur under Amédée Borrel (1867-1936) in the laboratory of microbiology courses.

In 1901-03 with Paul-Louis Simond (1858-1947) and Émile Marchoux (1862-1943), he conducted research of yellow fever in Brazil. With Marchoux, he identified Argas persicus as the vector of avian spirochaetosis.

In 1910 he participated on a mission to Russia, where he studied cholera, tuberculosis and the plague. In 1918 he was appointed director of "vaccine services" at the Pasteur Institute.
