= Georges Girard =

French bacteriologist (1888–1985)

Georges Girard (February 4, 1888 – February 19, 1985) was a French bacteriologist born in Isigny-sur-Mer, Calvados.

He studied medicine in Bordeaux, earning his bachelor's degree in 1911, and his medical doctorate in 1913. During World War I he was a doctor of colonial troops, receiving the Croix de Guerre in 1916. From 1917 to 1920 he was a physician in charge of the bacteriology laboratory at the hospital in Diego-Suarez. In 1922 he was appointed director of the Institute of Bacteriology of Madagascar (Institut Pasteur of Antananarivo), a position he maintained until 1940.

During his tenure in Madagascar, Girard conducted studies of typhoid, tuberculosis, leprosy and especially bubonic plague. Beginning in 1898 there had been sporadic outbreaks of the plague in the country, and none of the previously developed vaccines were strong or durable enough to handle the disease. In the 1930s, Girard and his assistant, Jean Robic developed an anti-plague vaccine known as the "EV strain". The EV strain had excellent results against the plague, and inoculation was carried out by Colonial Army medical officers and auxiliary Malagasy physicians. For decades afterwards this strain has been used worldwide to combat bubonic plague.

In 1941 he succeeded Edouard Dujardin-Beaumetz (1868-1947) as director of plague services at the Pasteur Institute in Paris. Here he conducted research of pasteurellosis, tularaemia and the bacillus- Yersinia pseudotuberculosis. From 1954 to 1958 he was president of the Société de pathologie exotique.
