= Maurice Nicolle =

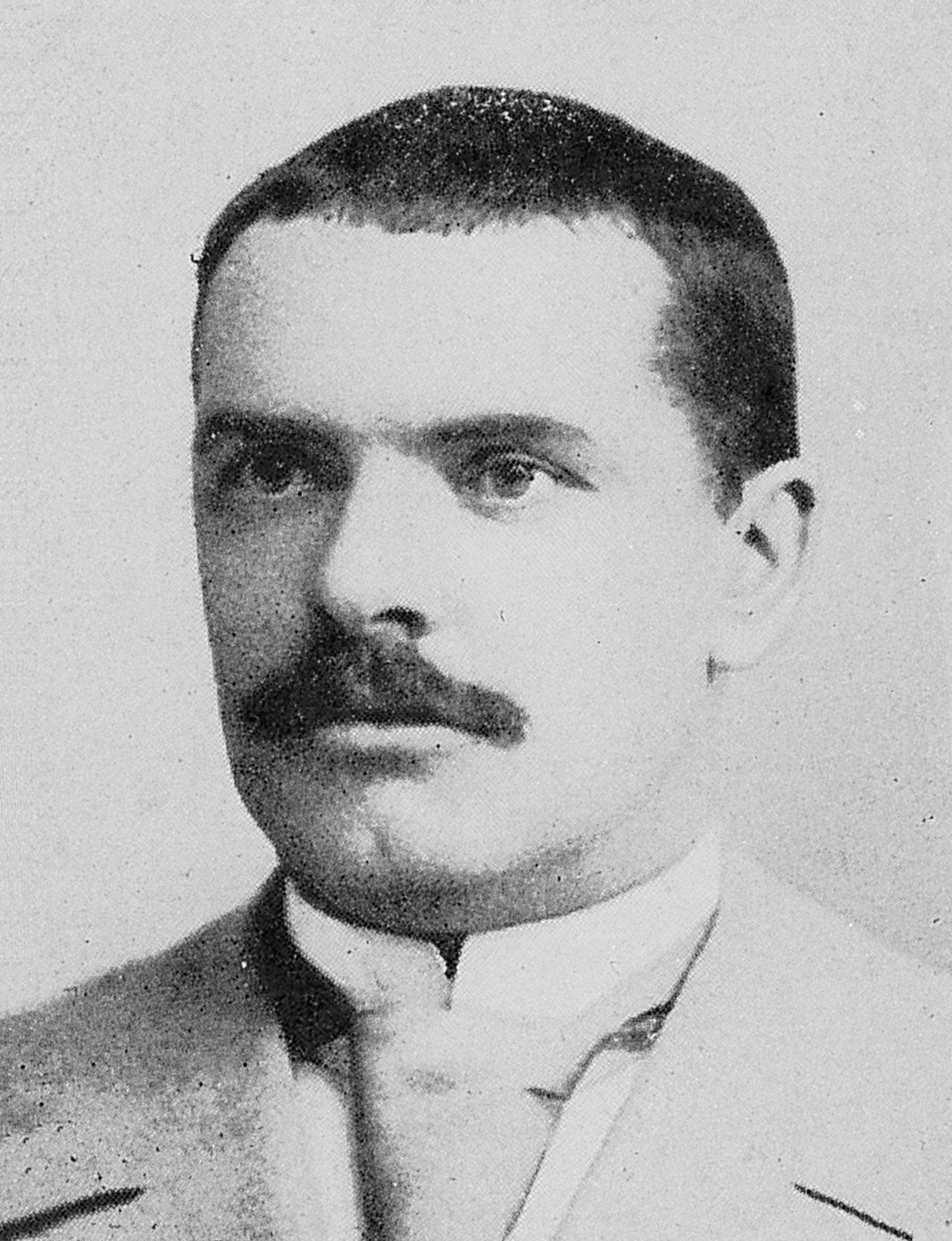
Maurice Nicolle

Maurice Nicolle (1 March 1862 – 20 August 1932) was a French physician and microbiologist born in Rouen. He was the brother of biologist Charles Nicolle (1866–1936).

He studied medicine in Rouen and Paris, becoming an interne to the hospitals of Paris in 1885. In 1887 he continued his internship under histologist Albert von Kölliker (1817–1905) at the University of Würzburg. In 1890 he supported his doctorate with a thesis on a study of diseases of the myocardium, titled Contribution à l'étude des affections du myocarde: les grandes scléroses cardiaques. Afterwards he took courses in microbiology at the Pasteur Institute. From 1893 he studied biological staining techniques with Victor Morax (1866–1935), publishing two papers on the staining properties of ammoniated ruthenium oxychloride with Jean Cantacuzène (1863–1934).

In 1893 he succeeded Waldemar Haffkine (1860–1930) as an instructor of microbiology at the Pasteur Institute, shortly afterwards being called to the Imperial Institute of Bacteriology of Constantinople, where he conducted research on pasteurellosis, rinderpest, bovine piroplasmosis and Aleppo button, et al. In Constantinople he also worked on improving methods for preparation of diphtheria toxin. In 1901, following disagreements with Turkish authorities and French representatives, he resigned his post at the bacteriological institute of Constantinople and returned to the Pasteur Institute.

At the Pasteur Institute he performed investigations on hypersensitivity and immunity (action of antibodies, antigens and antitoxins) following inoculations of glanders bacilli into guinea pigs. From 1906 with zoologist Felix Mesnil (1868–1938), he tested benzopurpurine dyes supplied by Bayer Pharmaceutical as trypanocidal agents for destruction of the parasite associated with trypanosomiasis.

In 1910 he succeeded Jean Binot (1867–1909) as laboratory head of microbiology courses at the Pasteur Institute. In 1920 he experienced an attack of paralysis on the right side of his body, followed by a second attack in 1926 that forced him into retirement.

In 1918 Nicolle became a member of the Société de biologie.

== Written works ==
- Eléments de microbiologie générale, 1900
- Traité de Microbiologie Générale, with Paul Remlinger, 1902

== Bibliography ==
- Service des Archives de l'Institut Pasteur (biography)
