= Jean Binot =

French microbiologist

Jean Binot (11 August 1867 – 25 November 1909) was a French microbiologist born in Saint-Mandé, Val-de-Marne.

He studied medicine in Paris, where one of his instructors was Raphael Blanchard (1857–1919). In 1887 he began work as an assistant préparateur in histology at the Collège de France, followed by an assignment as externe to the hospitals of Paris. In 1892 he became a hospital interne, and during the following year began taking courses in microbiology at the Pasteur Institute in Paris. From 1896 to 1900 he served as préparateur in Amédée Borrel's microbiology laboratory.

In 1899 he obtained his medical doctorate with a thesis titled Étude expérimentale sur le tétanos (Experimental study on tetanus). From 1900 to 1909 he was laboratory chief at the Pasteur Institute.

From 1898 onward, Binot took over 15,000 photographs of places he visited during his scientific journeys in Europe and Africa. In 1901 he traveled to Réunion and Madagascar. In Réunion he photographed a total eclipse of the Sun, and experienced a plague epidemic affecting the islands' cattle.

In 1900 he undertook research of microflora of the Mont Blanc massif, staying at the laboratory of astronomer Jules Janssen (1824-1907), who had an observatory on Mont Blanc. During his career, he amassed a large and varied collection of microorganisms for research purposes.
