= Édouard Dujardin-Beaumetz =

French biologist and physician

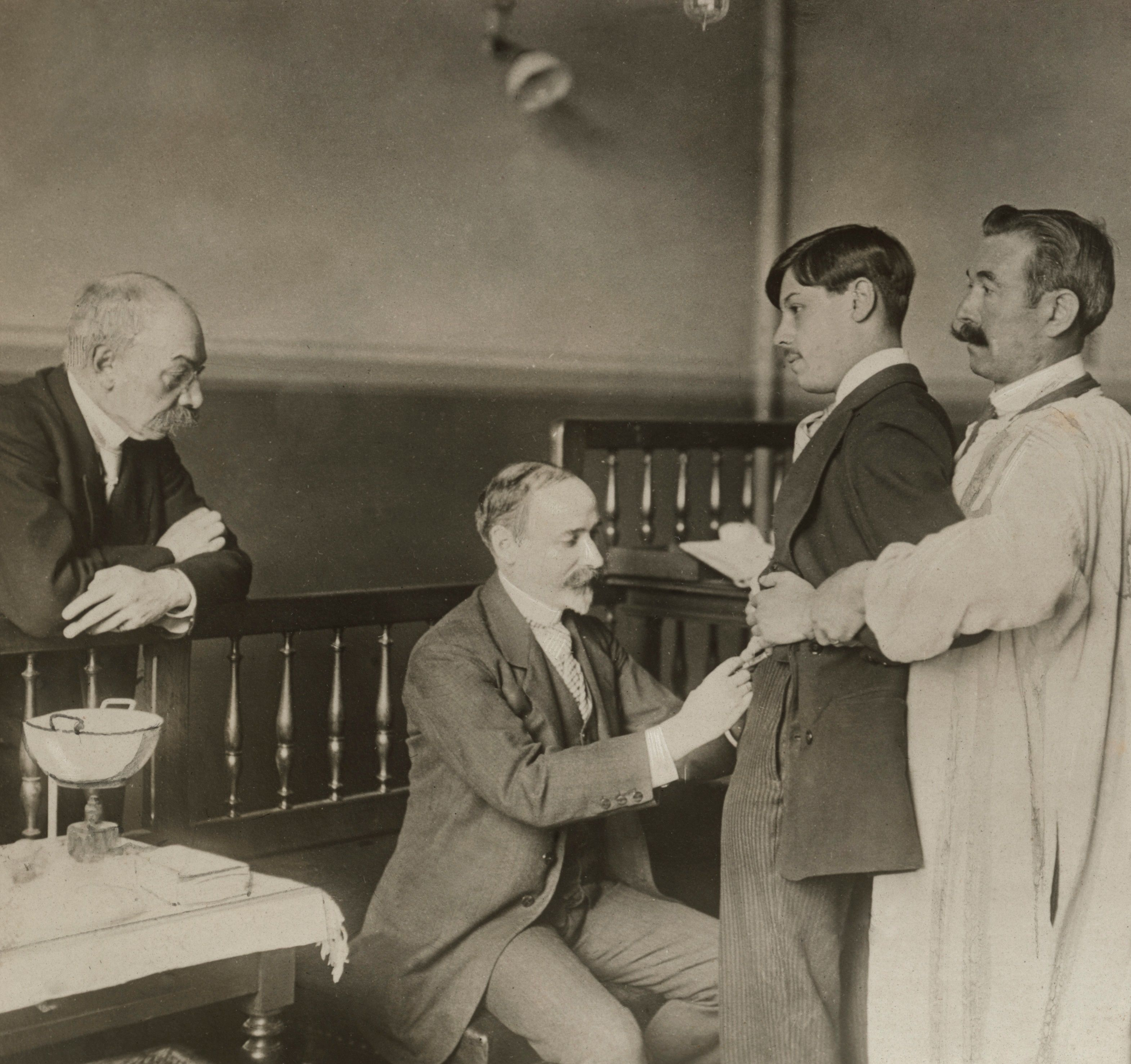
Dujardin-Beaumetz (center) at the Pasteur Institute in 1913

Édouard Dujardin-Beaumetz (1868 – 27 October 1947) was a French biologist and physician. He was the son of hygienist Georges Dujardin-Beaumetz (1833–1895).

He studied medicine in Paris, followed by courses in microbiology at the Pasteur Institute. In 1900, he supported his medical doctorate with a thesis on the microbe associated with pleuropneumonia, Le microbe de la péripneumonie et sa culture. In 1908, he was appointed laboratory head of plague services at the Pasteur Institute, where later in his career he became chief of plague services (chef du service de la peste), a post he kept until his retirement in 1940. In 1908 he was a founding member of the Société de pathologie exotique.

In 1929, with Alfred Boquet (1879–1947), he documented the similarities of the bubonic plague bacillus and the bacillus Yersinia pseudotuberculosis of rodents. Earlier in his career (1912), with Ernest Mosny (1861–1918), he conducted experiments on the evolvement of the bubonic plague in hibernating marmots.

With Paul Carnot (1869–1957), he wrote several chapters of the "Traité de thérapeutique" (1912). During World War II much of his property and archives were destroyed during the bombardment of the city of Nantes. He died in Nantes on October 27, 1947.

== Works ==
- Le microbe de la péripneumonie et sa culture.
- Sérothérapie et vaccination de la peste bubonique, with Éd. Dujardin.
