= Georges Dujardin-Beaumetz =

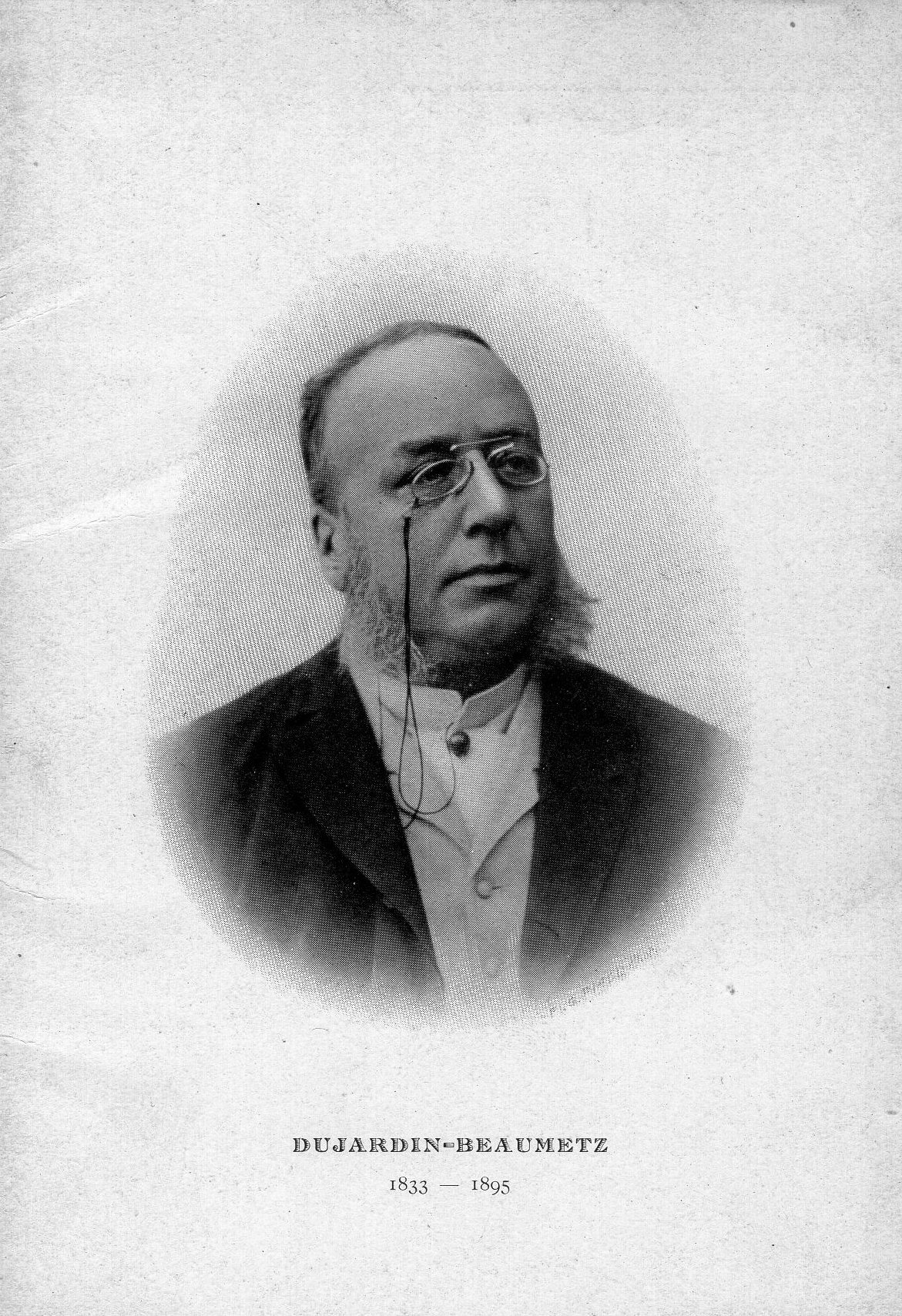
Georges Dujardin-Beaumetz

Georges Octave Dujardin-Beaumetz (27 November 1833, Barcelona – 15 February 1895, Paris) was a French physician and hygienist. He was the father of biologist Édouard Dujardin-Beaumetz (1868–1947).

== Biography ==
Dujardin-Beaumetz studied medicine in Paris, where he became a hospital interne in 1857. In 1862 he received his medical doctorate with the dissertation "De l'ataxie locomotrice", and three years later began work as chef de clinique at the faculty of medicine. From 1877 to 1884 he served as chef de service at the Hôpital Saint-Antoine, and afterwards worked in a similar capacity at the Hôpital Cochin.

He was a member of the Académie de médecine, and of the Legion of Honour (1871). He was also an editor of the "Bulletin général de thérapeutique médicale, chirurgicale, obstétricale et pharmaceutique".

== On vegetarianism ==
Dujardin-Beaumetz stated that a vegetarian diet may help patients with certain gastric diseases. However, Dujardin-Beaumetz was not a vegetarian and he defended the consumption of meat as part of an omnivorous diet. Despite this, Dujardin-Beaumetz was regularly cited by vegetarians to lend scientific credibility to their arguments.

== Published works ==
Several of his works (lessons on clinical therapy) have been translated into English, such as:

- "Clinical therapeutics; lectures in practical medicine delivered in the Hospital St. Antoine, Paris, France" (1885); Translation of Traitement des maladies du système nerveux, traitement des fièvres et des maladies générales, volume 3 of the author's Leçons clinique thérapeutique (translated by E.P. Hurd).
- "Diseases of the stomach and intestines; a manual of clinical therapeutics for the student and practitioner" (1886); Translation of a portion of volume 1, Traitement des maladies du coeur et de l'aorte, de l'estomac et de l'intestin of Leçons de clinique thérapeutique (translated from the 4th French edition by E.P. Hurd).
- "The modern treatment of diseases of the heart : a manual of clinical therapeutics" (1887); Translation of Leçons de clinique thérapeutique, volume 1 (translated from the fourth French edition by E.P. Hurd).
- "The modern treatment of diseases of the liver" (1888); translated from the 5th French edition by E.P. Hurd.
- "The modern treatment of diseases of the kidney" (1888); translated from the 5th French edition by E.P. Hurd.

Published works by Dujardin-Beaumetz with French titles

- De la myélite aiguë, 1872.
- Leçons de clinique thérapeutique, 1878.
- Les nouvelles médications, 1886.
- L'hygiène alimentaire, 1887.
- Formulaire pratique de thérapeutique et de pharmacologie (with P. Yvon, second edition 1888).
- L'hygiène thérapeutique; gymnastique, massage, hydrothérapie, aérothérapie, climatothérapie, 1888.
- L'hygiène prophylactique; microbes, ptomaines, désinfection, isolement, vaccinations et législation, 1889.
- Dictionnaire de thérapeutique, de matière médicale, de pharmacologie, de toxicologie et des eaux minérales, (main author. 4 volumes, 1883-1889).
