= Félix Mesnil =

French biologist (1868–1938)

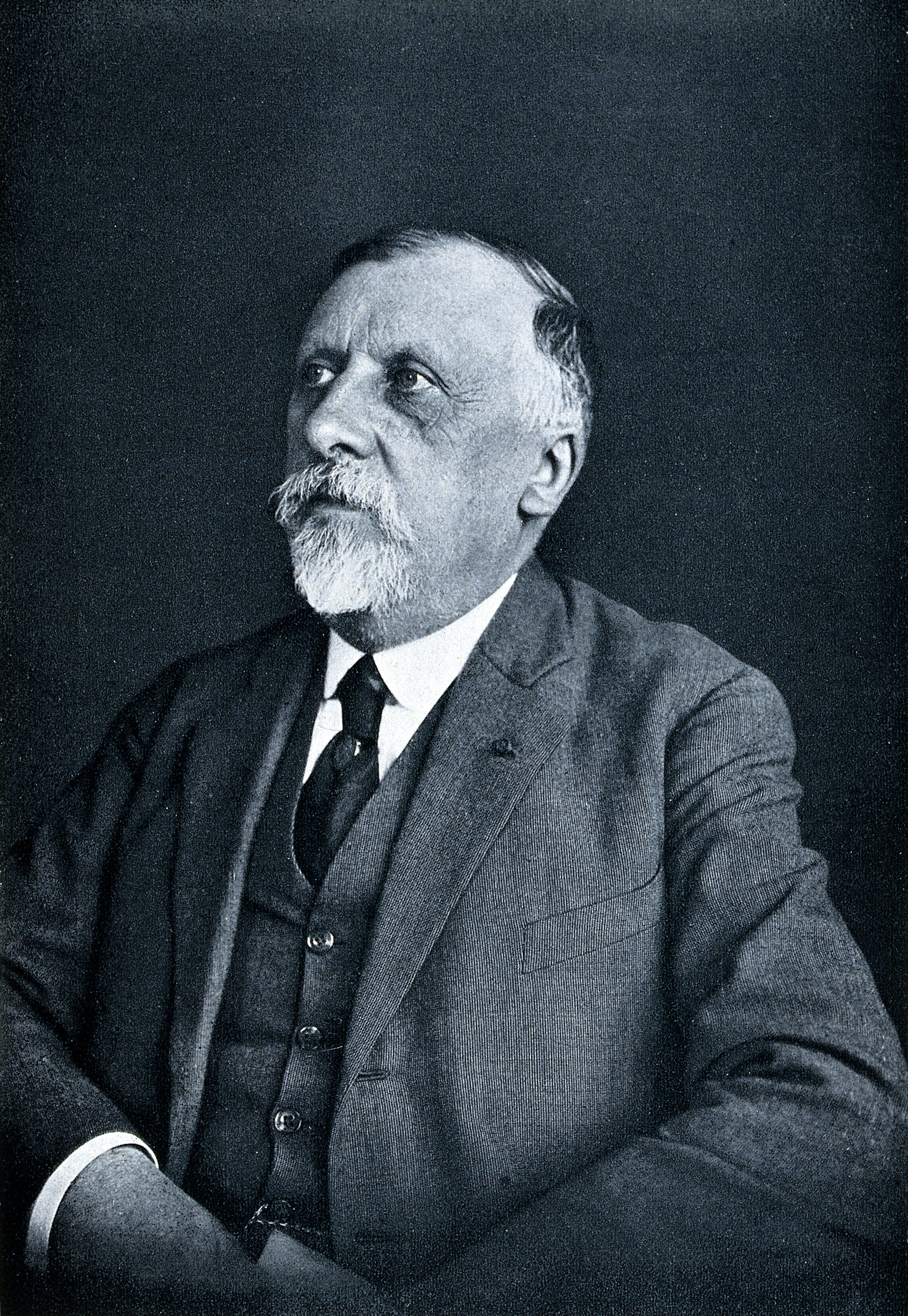
Félix Mesnil

Félix Étienne Pierre Mesnil (Omonville-la-Petite, La Manche department, 12 December 1868 – 15 February 1938, Paris) was a French zoologist, biologist, botanist, mycologist and algologist.

He was a student of Alfred Giard at the École Normale Supérieure and a classmate of Maurice Caullery. From 1892 he worked at the Pasteur Institute, initially as an associate demonstrator. He was an assistant of Louis Pasteur, and in the meantime, performed studies on cellular immunity, physiology and comparative pathology in the laboratory of Ilya Ilyich Metchnikov (1845–1916).

He founded the Pasteur Institute Bulletin with Gabriel Bertrand (1867–1962), Alexandre Besredka (1870–1940), Amédée Borrel (1867–1936), Camille Delezenne (1868–1932) and Auguste-Charles Marie (1864–1935).

As a member of the French Commission on sleeping sickness, he worked for the organisation of the mission in French Equatorial Africa.

He also worked for the creation of the Société de pathologie exotique, for which he became secretary, then president.

In 1903, together with Alphonse Laveran (1845–1922), he showed that the parasite responsible for the visceral leishmaniasis (or "Kala-azar", a fever in India), first described by William Boog Leishman (1865–1926), is a new protozoa, different from Trypanosoma, the agent of the sleeping sickness, and from Plasmodium, the agent of paludism (malaria). He temporarily named it Piroplasma donovani and Sir Ronald Ross (1857–1932) proposed the genus name Leishmania for it.

In 1920, he and Émile Roubaud achieved the first experimental infection of chimpanzees with Plasmodium vivax.

- In 1908, he is assistant director at the École pratique des hautes études.
- In 1910, he is professor at the Pasteur Institute.
- In 1913, he is vice-president of the Société de biologie.
- In 1920, he is a member of the Comité consultatif de l'enseignement de médecine vétérinaire coloniale.
- In 1921, he is of member of the French Academy of Sciences.
- In 1922, he is a founding member of the Académie des sciences coloniales.
- In 1926, he is president of the Société zoologique de France.
- In 1931, he is one of the free members of the Académie de médecine.

== See also ==
- History of malaria
