= Ernest Mosny =

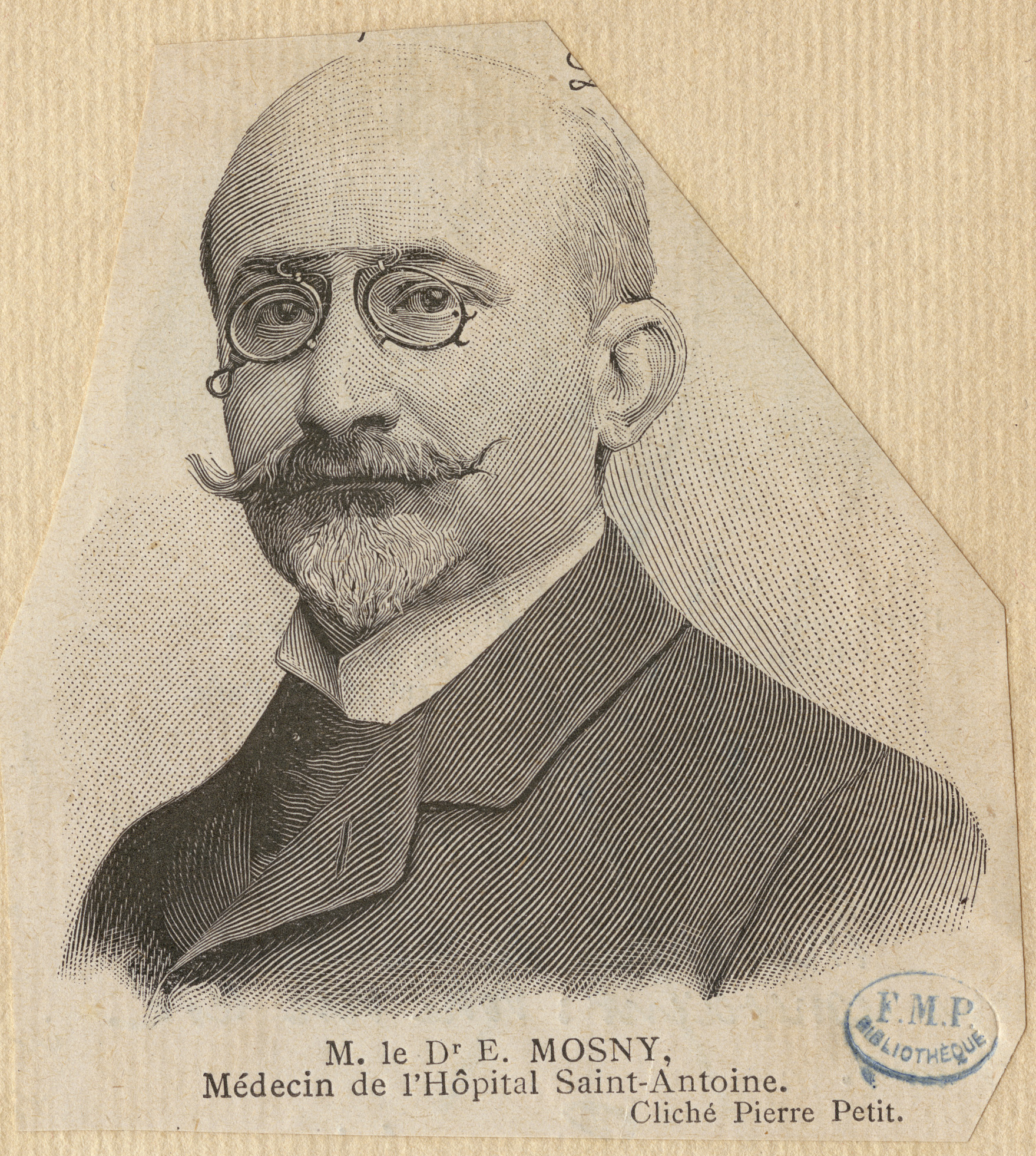
Ernest Mosny

Ernest Mosny (4 January 1861 – 25 April 1918) was a French physician and hygienist born in La Fère, Aisne.

Mosny served as médecin des hopitaux in Paris, and was a member of the Académie de Médecine and the Conseil supérieur d'hygiène.

He is remembered for his work in the field of microbiology. With Joaquín Albarrán (1860–1912) he performed a series of tests in an attempt to find an antidote to the colon bacillus. Eventually the two scientists developed a vaccine that achieved a high degree of immunity in dogs and rabbits. In 1912 with biologist Edouard Dujardin-Beaumetz (1868–1947), he studied the effects of bubonic plague in two Alpine marmots during hibernation. Reportedly, the marmots were able to survive 61 and 115 days after being injected with the disease.

In 1911 Mosny reported the first successful embolectomy, a direct arterial surgical procedure that was performed on the femoral artery.

== Written works ==
With pathologist Paul Brouardel (1937–1906) and others, he was co-author of the multi-volume Traité d'hygiène. Other principal works by Mosby include:

- Note sur une pseudo-tuberculose du lièvre, 1891.
- Broncho-pneumonie, 1892 (bronchopneumonia).
- La Peste, 1897 (The plague).
- La protection de la santé publique, 1904 (The protection of public health).
- Méningite saturnine subaigüe avec hémiparésie motrice passagère, 1911 (with François Saint-Girons).
