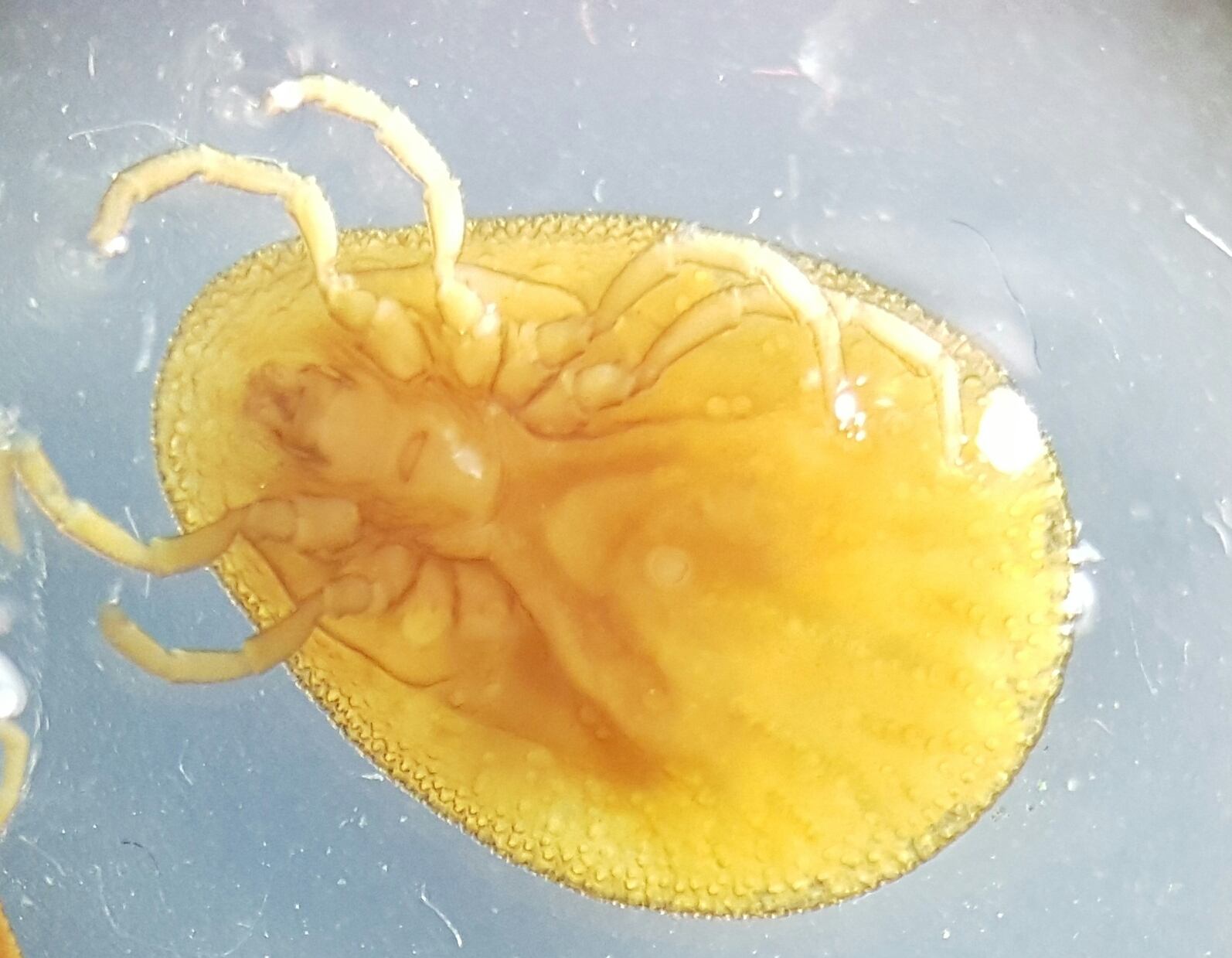

Scientific classification
- Domain: Eukaryota
- Kingdom: Animalia
- Phylum: Arthropoda
- Subphylum: Chelicerata
- Class: Arachnida
- Order: Ixodida
- Family: Argasidae
- Genus: Argas
- Species: A. persicus

Binomial name
- Argas persicus (Oken, 1818)

= Argas persicus =

Species of tick

Argas persicus, also known as fowl tick or poultry tick, is a small soft-bodied tick that is found primarily on domestic fowl such as chickens, ducks, and geese. It was first recorded by Lorenz Oken in 1818 in Mianeh, Persia, and named Rhynochoprion persicum.

Argas persicus appears yellowish-brown when starved and slatey-blue when engorged. They are found on an animal host, in cracks and crevices of buildings or in nests.

They are also carriers of the spirochete bacteria Borrelia anserina which causes avian spirochetosis, one of the most severe diseases affecting the poultry industry.

In addition to domestic fowl, A. persicus may also feed on humans, although an immunity has been acquired by some individuals.

== Distribution ==
The fowl tick is distributed worldwide but does tend to prefer a warmer climate. The lower United States especially sees a large distribution of this soft bodied tick due to the warm climate.

== Life cycle ==
Argasid (soft) ticks have a multihost life cycle meaning it has two or more nymphal stages that each require a blood meal.

Mating and the laying of eggs occurs off the host and in sheltered areas such as bird nests. Six-legged larvae hatch from the eggs in the chosen sheltered area. Once a suitable host is found in the vicinity, they begin to feed for a few hours to a few days. The larvae finish feeding and leaves the host for an area of shelter. The larvae then molt to become the first nymph stage. The first nymphs stage then move onto the second host to feed. This second host may be the same individual as the first and is likely the same species. The first stage of nymphs transforms to the next nymph stage when it leaves the host and molts once more. These nymph stages can reach up to seven stages. After the last nymph stage, it leaves the host to molt into an adult. The adults can continue to feed on the host feeding quickly and detaching from the host after each blood meal. Females often lay eggs after each meal when off the host.

== Pathogen transmission ==
A. persicus is a natural reservoir for B. anserina as it helps these spirochetes survive longer. West Nile virus was also found to be able to infect the tick when feeding on an infected membrane. This was tested using artificial inoculation. If the pathogen infects humans due to A. persicus, it would likely be as an incidental host but humans may be fed upon by any of the stages.

== Disease and symptoms ==
=== Avian spirochetosis ===
This disease is sepsis by B. anserina being transmitted in A. persicus saliva. The spirochete can be seen in blood samples taken from infected birds. Young birds appear to be especially susceptible to the larvae of A. persicus due to not having been exposed to it before. Although domestic birds do not fully develop immunity against the paralysis inducing toxins produced, a weak protective mechanism may result from having been infected.

Symptoms of avian spirochetosis include drop in egg production, depression, polydipsia (increased thirst), drowsiness, anorexia, loss of appetite, green diarrhea, ruffled feathers, pale combs, weight loss, paralysis of the legs and wings (flaccid paralysis), and abrupt death. Before death, the bird tends to become recumbent or begins to lie down stretched out. This is especially true when heavily infested with the larval stage of A. persicus.

=== Fowl tick infection and tick paralysis ===
Tick paralysis is included in avian spirochetosis and appears in the same fashion. The flaccid paralysis ascends throughout the body. Incoordination first occurs followed by paralysis of the hind limbs, forelimbs, and then leads to respiratory distress and failure. Death then follows. Blood loss during infection could occur as well and result in clinical anemia.

== Treatment ==
Controlling the larvae is important as it acts as a vector for B. anserina. Repeated treatments with malathion spray helps to reduce the ticks and helps the birds recover. Penicillin injections appear to have no effect in treatment of the bacteria. The elimination of tick larvae is key to reversing the effects of avian spirochetosis. Hydration is also extremely important as death most often results due to dehydration from prolonged paralysis.
