= Auguste-Charles Marie =

French microbiologist

Auguste-Charles Marie (26 July 1864 – 29 March 1935) was a French microbiologist born in Bayeux, department Calvados.

He served as interne des hôpitaux in Paris, earning his medical doctorate in 1895 with a thesis on cancer titled Recherches sur la question du cancer. From 1894 to 1899 he focused on physico-pathological studies of microbial poisoning at the Pasteur Institute in Paris. From 1899–1900 he served under Maurice Nicolle (1862–1932) as chief of anti-rabies services at the institute of microbiology in Constantinople. Afterwards he was associated with research done at the Pasteur Institute in Paris. Following the death of Emile Roux (1853–1933), he was appointed manager of anti-rabies services.

Marie is known for his research involving the action of tetanus toxin on the nervous system, as well as studies of tuberculosis and rabies. In the 1910s he demonstrated that natural and synthetic suprarenin had the ability to neutralize diphtheria and tetanus toxins. His investigations of rabies led to the development of new vaccination processes. With Jean Cantacuzène (1863-1934), he published two articles on gastrointestinal cholera.

In 1903 he was co-founder of the Bulletin de l'Institut Pasteur. In 1934, with Paul Remlinger (1871–1964), he was recipient of the "Prix Dagnan-Bouveret" by the Académie des sciences for work involving rage expérimentale (experimental rabies). He died on 29 March 1935 in his laboratory at the Pasteur Institute.

== Publications ==
- Recherches sur la toxine tétanique (1897) – research of tetanus toxin.
- Action activante de la muqueuse intestinale sur les propriétés pathogènes du vibrion cholérique, (around 1919, with Jean Cantacuzène).
- Apparition précoce de sensibilisatrice spécifique dans l'intestin grêle des cholériques, (around 1919, with Jean Cantacuzène).
