= Gabriel Bertrand =

Biochemist and bacteriologist

- Born: 17 May 1867; Paris
- Died: 20 June 1962 (aged 95); Paris
- Known for: concepts of oxidase and trace elements Bertrand's rule
- Scientific career
- Institutions: Institut Pasteur
- Doctoral advisor: Émile Duclaux
- Other academic advisors: Edmond Frémy

Gabriel Bertrand (born 17 May 1867 in Paris, died 20 June 1962 in Paris) was a French pharmacologist, biochemist and bacteriologist.

Bertrand introduced into biochemistry both the term “oxidase” and the concept of trace elements.

The laccase, a polyphenol oxidase and an enzyme oxidating urishiol and laccol obtained from the lacquer tree, was first studied by Gabriel Bertrand in 1894.

Bertrand's rule refers to the fact that the dose–response curve for many micronutrients is non-monotonic, having an initial stage of increasing benefits with increased intake, followed by increasing costs as excesses become toxic. In 2005, Raubenheimer et al. fed excess carbohydrates to Spodoptera littoralis and extended Bertrand's rule to macronutrients.

Along with Césaire Phisalix, Bertrand isolated the psychedelic drug bufotenin in 1893, though its hallucinogenic effects were not discovered until much later. In 1894, also with Phisalix, he developed an antivenom for use against snake bites.

Bertrand was made a member of the Académie Nationale de Médecine in 1931. In 1932 he became foreign member of the Royal Netherlands Academy of Arts and Sciences.
