= Amédée Borrel =

French biologist

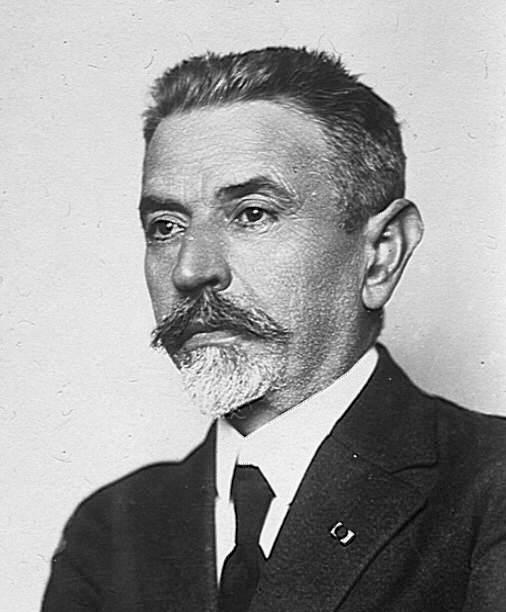
- Born: 1 August 1867; Cazouls-lès-Béziers, Hérault
- Died: 14 September 1936 (aged 69)
- Education: University of Montpellier
- Known for: Viral theory of cancer Borrelia
- Scientific career
- Fields: virology

Amédée Marie Vincent Borrel (1 August 1867 – 14 September 1936) was a French physician and microbiologist born in Cazouls-lès-Béziers, Hérault.

== Biography ==
Borrel studied natural sciences and medicine at the University of Montpellier, where he earned his degree in 1890. From 1892 to 1895, Borrel worked in the laboratory of Ilya Ilyich Metchnikoff (1845–1916) at the Pasteur Institute in Paris. Here he performed research of tuberculosis, and with Alexandre Yersin (1863–1943) and Léon Charles Albert Calmette (1863–1933), he worked on a vaccine against bubonic plague. With Yersin and Calmette, he co-published the treatise Le microbe de la peste à bubons concerning the plague bacillus. He is also credited for pioneer investigations on the viral theory of cancer.

From 1896 to 1914 he served as laboratory chief of the microbiology course at the Pasteur Institute. In 1919 he attained the chair of bacteriology at the University of Strasbourg.

A genus of bacteria called Borrelia is named after him, as is borreliosis (i.e., Lyme disease). Moreover, "Borrel bodies", which are tiny virus-containing granules that cluster to form "Bollinger bodies", are found in tissue cells of fowlpox. (Bollinger bodies are named after German pathologist Otto Bollinger [1843–1909]).

In 1900 Borrel became a member of the Société de biologie. During World War I, Borrel developed one of the earliest known gas masks.

== Honors and awards ==
- Commander of the Order of Legion of Honour
- Grand Officer of the Order of the Crown of Italy
- Commander of the Order of Glory (Tunisia)
- Grand Officer of the Order of the Oak Crown

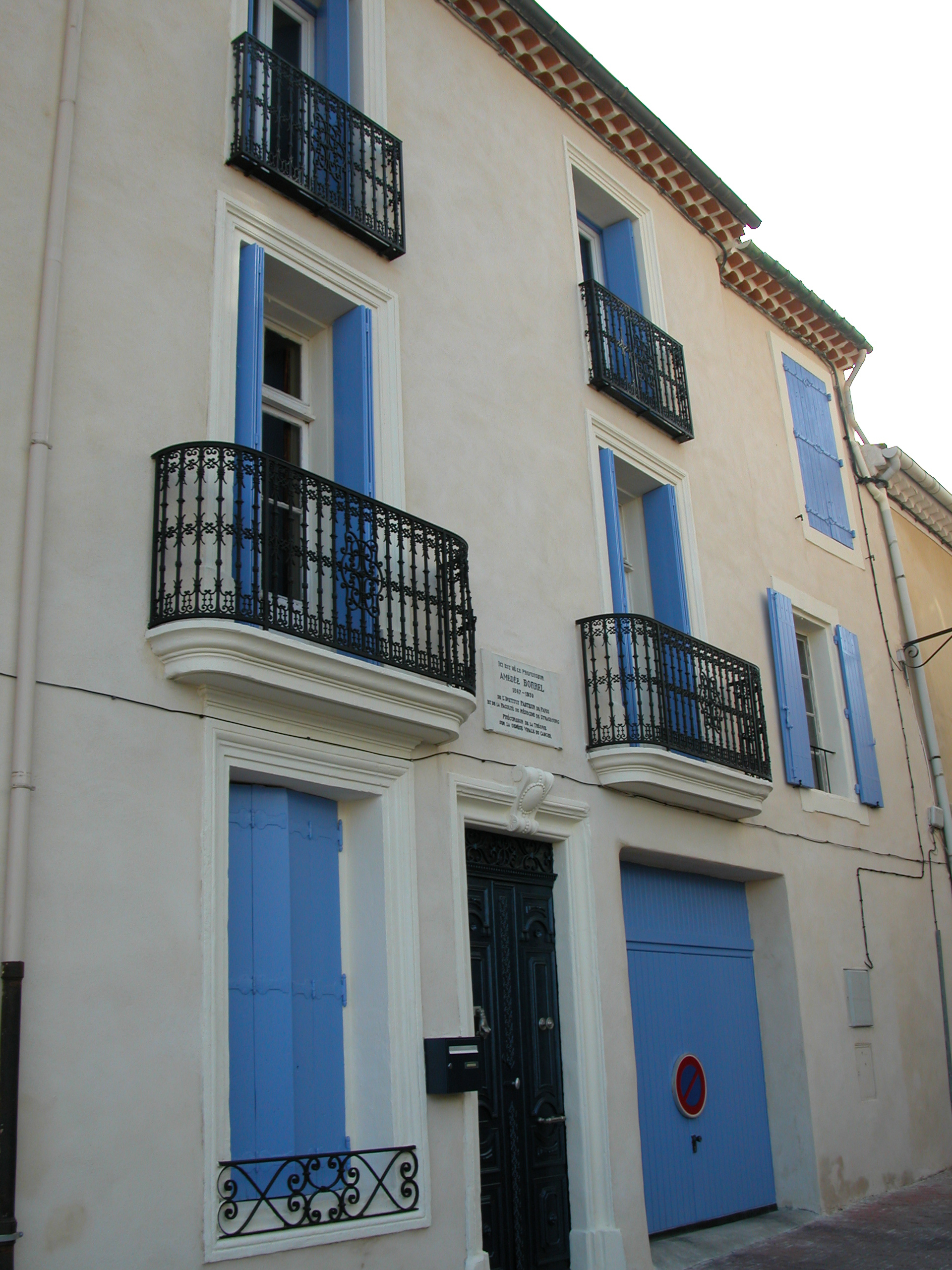
Borrel's birthplace in Cazouls-lès-Béziers
