= Human-to-primate transmission =

Human-to-primate transmission (HPT) is a seldom-remarked epidemiologic vector. It is by definition a cross-species transmission vector.

== Unsupervised HPT ==
In 1998, The Zoonotic Importance of Mycobacterium Tuberculosis: Transmission From Human to Monkey was noticed.

In 2001, scientists noticed that antibodies peculiar to humans were found in macaque monkeys, both wild and domesticated. Of the panel of human viruses studied, measles, influenza A, and parainfluenza 1, 2 and 3 were found in some of the studied animals.

In 2006, scientists noticed HPT of measles, rubella, and parainfluenza in the case of performing monkeys, who are "a common phenomena in Asia".

In 2015 and again in 2016, scientists found that HPT likely had occurred in the case of Staphylococcus aureus.

In 2018, scientists speculated that HPT was likely to have occurred in the case of human malaria parasites.

Also in 2018, scientists speculated that an outbreak of tuberculosis among a closed breeding colony of Aotus monkeys was likely due to continuing intermittent HPT exposure.
