= Melaka (disambiguation) =

Melaka is an alternative spelling of Malacca, a state of Malaysia. It may also refer to:

- Melaka Fray, fictional character in the Buffy the Vampire Slayer comic series
- Malabo Lopelo Melaka (c. 1837–1937), former Bubi king in modern-day Equatorial Guinea
- Melaka virus, a bat-borne virus
