= Melaka virus =

Virus classification
- (unranked): Virus
- Realm: Riboviria
- Kingdom: Orthornavirae
- Phylum: Duplornaviricota
- Class: Resentoviricetes
- Order: Reovirales
- Family: Spinareoviridae
- Genus: Orthoreovirus
- Species: Nelson Bay orthoreovirus
- Virus: Melaka virus

Species of virus

Melaka virus (MELV) is a bat-borne virus. It was first isolated in a human in Melaka, Malaysia in 2006. A bat reservoir was suspected because traceback analysis revealed that the patient had been exposed to a bat prior to the onset of infection. Melaka virus causes a non-fatal respiratory tract illness in humans.

== Virology ==
Melaka virus is a nonenveloped, segmented, double-stranded RNA virus. Having a segmented genome facilitates reassortment. Melaka is a fusogenic virus which enhances virulence in its ability to carry out cell-cell fusion.

== Transmission ==
Transmission is believed to be human to human through droplet respiration. The patient was the sole member of his family to be exposed to the bat, yet three members of his family became ill with the virus.

== See also ==
- Orphan virus
- Xi River virus
- Cell-cell fusogens
