= Xi River virus =

Virus classification
- (unranked): Virus
- Realm: Riboviria
- Kingdom: Orthornavirae
- Phylum: Duplornaviricota
- Class: Resentoviricetes
- Order: Reovirales
- Family: Spinareoviridae
- Genus: Orthoreovirus
- Species: incertae sedis
- Virus: Xi River virus

Putative bat virus in the genus Orthoreovirus isolated from fruit bats in Guangdong

Xi River virus (XRV) is a putative novel bat virus in the genus Orthoreovirus isolated from fruit bats in Guangdong Province in southern China. It is the first bat reovirus isolated in China.

== Virology ==
=== Genome ===
Only a partial sequence of XRV was isolated from the fruit bat, but based on its open reading frame it was identified as a reovirus. XRV has the same morphology and high sequence identity as Nelson Bay virus (NBV), and a 10-segmented double-stranded RNA genome, as well as high sequence identity to NBV members.

Reoviruses are non-enveloped, double-stranded RNA viruses. They have an icosahedral capsid (T-13) composed of an outer and inner protein shell. The genome contains 10–12 segments grouped into three categories by size: L (large), M (medium) and S (small). Segments range from ~ 3.9 kbp – 1kbp and each segment encodes 1–3 proteins. Reoviridae proteins are denoted by the Greek character corresponding to the segment it was translated from (the L segment encodes for λ proteins, the M segment encodes for μ proteins and the S segment encodes for σ proteins).

== See also ==
- Bat-borne virus
- Double-stranded RNA viruses
- Nelson Bay virus
- Oncolytic virus
- Orphan virus
