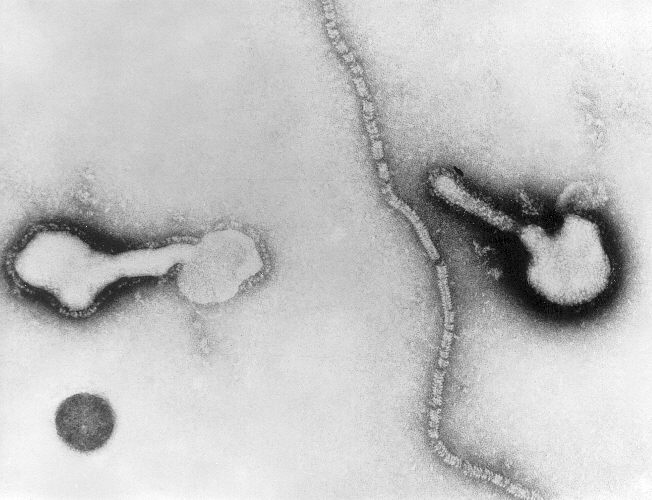
- Transmission electron micrograph of a parainfluenza virus. Two intact particles and free filamentous nucleocapsid

Scientific classification
- (unranked): Virus
- Realm: Riboviria
- Kingdom: Orthornavirae
- Phylum: Negarnaviricota
- Class: Monjiviricetes
- Order: Mononegavirales
- Family: Paramyxoviridae

Groups included
- Respirovirus (part); Human respirovirus 1 (formerly Human parainfluenza virus 1); Human respirovirus 3 (formerly Human parainfluenza virus 3); Rubulavirus (part); Human rubulavirus 2 (formerly Human parainfluenza virus 2); Human rubulavirus 4 (formerly Human parainfluenza virus 4)

Cladistically included but traditionally excluded taxa
- Aquaparamyxovirus; Avulavirus; Ferlavirus; Henipavirus; Morbillivirus; Respirovirus (part); Bovine respirovirus 3; Murine respirovirus; Porcine respirovirus 1; Rubulavirus (part); Achimota rubulavirus 1; Achimota rubulavirus 2; Bat mumps rubulavirus; Mammalian rubulavirus 5; Mapuera rubulavirus; Menangle rubulavirus; Mumps rubulavirus; Porcine rubulavirus; Simian rubulavirus; Sosuga rubulavirus; Teviot rubulavirus; Tioman rubulavirus; Tuhoko rubulavirus 1; Tuhoko rubulavirus 2; Tuhoko rubulavirus 3; Pneumoviridae; Rhabdoviridae; Sunviridae; Xinmoviridae

= Human parainfluenza viruses =

Human parainfluenza viruses (HPIVs) are the viruses that cause human parainfluenza. HPIVs are a paraphyletic group of four distinct single-stranded RNA viruses belonging to the Paramyxoviridae family. These viruses are closely associated with both human and veterinary disease. Virions are approximately 150–250 nm in size and contain negative-sense RNA with a genome encompassing about 15,000 nucleotides.

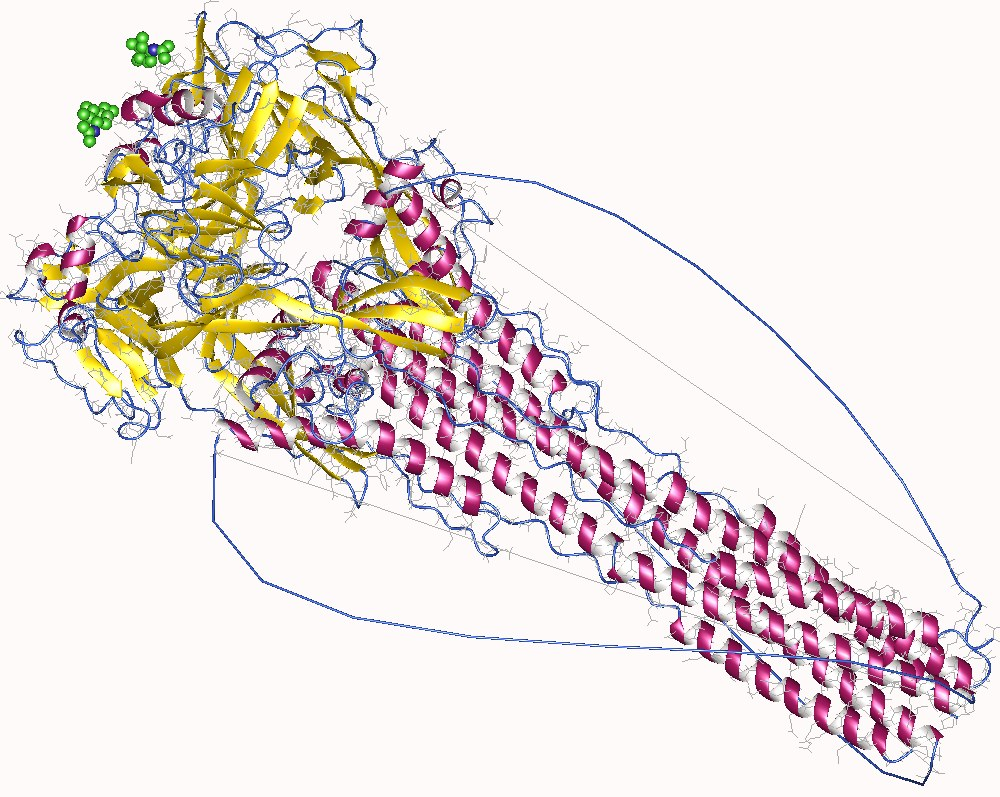
Fusion glycoprotein trimer of human parainfluenza virus 3.

The viruses can be detected via cell culture, immunofluorescent microscopy, and polymerase chain reaction. HPIVs lack antiviral drug and vaccine options, remain a major contributor toward the annual burden of hospitalisations among children younger than age 5—being second only to respiratory syncytial virus (RSV) in this regard—and are the predominant cause of laryngotracheobronchitis (also known as croup).

== Classification ==
The HPIVs were discovered in the latter part of the 1950s. HPIVs belong to two genera: Respirovirus (HPIV-1 and HPIV-3) and Rubulavirus (HPIV-2 and HPIV-4). The taxonomic classification is mainly based on antigenic and genetic features, which were initially thought to form four major serotypes or clades but are now considered separate virus species. These include:

| Virus | GenBank acronym | NCBI taxonomy | Notes |
|---|---|---|---|
| Human parainfluenza virus type 1 | HPIV-1 | 12730 | Most common cause of croup |
| Human parainfluenza virus type 2 | HPIV-2 | 11212 | Causes croup and other illnesses of the upper and lower respiratory tracts |
| Human parainfluenza virus type 3 | HPIV-3 | 11216 | Associated with bronchiolitis and pneumonia |
| Human parainfluenza virus type 4 | HPIV-4 | 11203 | Includes subtypes 4a and 4b |

=== Viral structure and organisation ===
HPIVs are enveloped virions containing single-stranded negative-sense RNA. Non-infectious virions have also been reported to contain RNA with positive polarity. HPIV genomes are about 15,000 nucleotides in length and encode six key structural proteins. The structural gene sequence of HPIVs is 3′-NP-P-M-F-HN-L-5′; the protein prefixes and further details are outlined in the table below.

| Structural protein | Location | Function |
|---|---|---|
| Hemagglutinin-neuraminidase (HN) | Envelope | Attachment and cell entry |
| Fusion protein (F) | Envelope | Fusion and cell entry |
| Viral matrix protein (M) | Within the envelope | Assembly |
| Nucleoprotein (NP) | Nucleocapsid | Forms a complex with the RNA genome |
| Phosphoprotein (P) | Nucleocapsid | Forms as part of RNA polymerase complex |
| Large protein (L) | Nucleocapsid | Forms as part of RNA polymerase complex |

With the advent of reverse genetics, it has been found that the most efficient human parainfluenza viruses (in terms of replication and transcription) have a total genome nucleotide count that is divisible by 6. This has led to the "rule of six" being coined. Exceptions to the rule have been found, and its exact advantages are not fully understood.

Electrophoresis studies have shown that the molecular weight of the proteins of the four HPIVs is similar (except for the phosphoprotein, which shows significant variation).

=== Viral entry and replication ===
Viral replication is initiated only after successful entry into a cell by attachment and fusion between the virus and the host cell's lipid membrane. Viral RNA (vRNA) is initially associated with nucleoprotein (NP), phosphoprotein (P), and the large protein (L). Hemagglutinin–neuraminidase (HN) is involved in viral attachment and thus hemadsorption and hemagglutination. Furthermore, the fusion (F) protein is important in aiding the fusion of the host and viral cellular membranes, eventually forming syncytia.

Initially, the F protein is in an inactive form (F_{0}) but can be cleaved by proteolysis to form its active form, F_{1} and F_{2}, linked by disulfide bonds. Once complete, this is followed by the HPIV nucleocapsid entering the cytoplasm of the cell. Subsequently, genomic transcription occurs using the virus's own viral RNA-dependent RNA polymerase (L protein). The cell's own ribosomes are then tasked with translation, forming the viral proteins from the viral mRNA.

Towards the end of the process (after the formation of the viral proteins), the viral genome is replicated. Initially, this occurs with the formation of a positive-sense RNA (an intermediate step necessary for producing progeny), and finally, negative-sense RNA is formed, which is then associated with the nucleoprotein. This may then be either packaged and released from the cell by budding or used for subsequent rounds of transcription and replication.

The observable morphological changes in infected cells include enlargement of the cytoplasm, decreased mitotic activity, and focal rounding, with the potential formation of multinucleate cells (i.e., syncytia).

The pathogenicity of HPIVs is mutually dependent on the viruses having the correct accessory proteins that can elicit anti-interferon properties. This is a major factor in the clinical significance of disease.

=== Host range ===
The main host remains the human. However, infections have been induced in other animals (both under natural and experimental situations), although these were always asymptomatic.

== Clinical significance ==
It is estimated that there are 5 million children with lower respiratory infections (LRI) each year in the United States alone. HPIV-1, HPIV-2 and HPIV-3 have been linked with up to a third of these infections. Upper respiratory infections (URI) are also important in the context of HPIV, however, they are caused to a lesser extent by the virus. The highest rates of serious HPIV illnesses occur among young children, and surveys have shown that about 75% of children aged 5 or older have antibodies to HPIV-1.

Symptoms include fever, cough (mild, barky or with mucus), a runny or stuffy nose, sore throat, wheezing, hoarseness and sneezing.

For infants and young children, it has been estimated that about 25% will develop "clinically significant disease".

Repeated infection throughout the life of the host is not uncommon and symptoms of later breakouts include upper respiratory tract illness, such as cold and a sore throat. The incubation period for all four serotypes is 1 to 7 days. In immunosuppressed people, parainfluenza virus infections can cause severe pneumonia, which can be fatal.

HPIV-1 and HPIV-2 have been demonstrated to be the principal causative agent behind croup (laryngotracheobronchitis), which is a viral disease of the upper airway and is mainly problematic in children aged 6–48 months of age. Biennial epidemics starting in autumn are associated with both HPIV-1 and -2; however, HPIV-2 can also have yearly outbreaks. Additionally, HPIV-1 tends to cause biennial outbreaks of croup in the fall. In the United States, large peaks have presently been occurring during odd-numbered years.

HPIV-3 has been closely associated with bronchiolitis and pneumonia, and principally targets those aged <1 year.

HPIV-4 remains infrequently detected. It is now believed to be more common than previously thought but less likely to cause severe disease. By the age of 10, the majority of children are seropositive for HPIV-4 infection—this may be indicative of a large proportion of asymptomatic or mild infections.

Those with compromised immunity have a higher risk of infection and mortality and may fall ill with more extreme forms of LRI. Associations between HPIVs and neurologic disease are known. For example, hospitalisation with certain HPIVs has a strong association with febrile seizures. HPIV-4b has the strongest association, up to 62% of HPIV-4b hospitalisations, followed by HPIV-3 (17%) and -1 (7%).

HPIVs have also been linked with rare cases of viral meningitis and Guillain–Barré syndrome.

HPIVs are spread from person to person (i.e., horizontal transmission) by contact with infected secretions in respiratory droplets or contaminated surfaces or objects. Infection can occur when infectious material contacts the mucous membranes of the eyes, mouth, or nose, and possibly through the inhalation of droplets generated by a sneeze or cough. HPIVs can remain infectious in airborne droplets for over an hour.

=== Airway inflammation ===
The inflammation of the airway is a common attribute of HPIV infection. It is believed to occur due to the large scale upregulation of inflammatory cytokines. Common cytokines observed to be upregulated include IFN–α, various interleukins (i.e., IL–2, IL-6), and TNF–α. Various chemokines and inflammatory proteins are also believed to be associated with the common symptoms of HPIV infection.

Recent evidence suggests that the virus-specific antibody immunoglobulin E may be responsible for mediating the large-scale releases of histamine in the trachea that are believed to cause croup.

=== Immunology ===
The body's primary defense against HPIV infection is adaptive immunity involving both humoral and cellular immunity. With humoral immunity, antibodies that bind to the surface viral proteins HN and F protect against later infection. Patients with defective cell-mediated immunity also experience more severe infection, suggesting that T cells are important in clearing infection.

== Diagnosis ==
Diagnosis can be made in several ways, encompassing a range of multi-faceted techniques:

- Isolation and detection of the virus in cell culture.
- Detection of viral antigens directly within bodily respiratory tract secretions using immunofluorescence, enzyme immunoassays or fluoroimmunoassays.
- Polymerase chain reaction (PCR).
- Analysis of specific IgG antibodies showing a subsequent rise in titre following infection (using paired serum specimens).

Because of the similarity in terms of the antigenic profile between the viruses, hemagglutination assay (HA) or hemadsorption inhibition (HAdI) processes are often used. Both complement fixation, neutralisation, and enzyme linked immunosorbent assays – ELISA, can also be used to aid in the process of distinguishing between viral serotypes.

== Morbidity and mortality ==
Mortality caused by HPIVs in developed regions of the world remains rare. Where mortality has occurred, it is principally in the three core risk groups (very young, elderly and immuno-compromised). Long-term changes can however be associated with airway remodeling and are believed to be a significant cause of morbidity. The exact associations between HPIVs and diseases such as chronic obstructive pulmonary disease (COPD) are still being investigated.

In developing regions of the world, preschool children remain the highest mortality risk group. Mortality may be a consequence of primary viral infection or secondary problems, such as bacterial infection. Predispositions, such as malnutrition and other deficiencies, may further elevate the chances of mortality associated with infection.

Overall, LRIs cause approximately 25–30% of total deaths in preschool children in the developing world. HPIVs are believed to be associated with 10% of all LRI cases, thus remaining a significant cause of mortality.

=== Risk factors ===
Numerous factors have been suggested and linked to a higher risk of acquiring the infection, inclusive of malnutrition, vitamin A deficiency, absence of breastfeeding during the early stages of life, environmental pollution and overcrowding.

== Prevention ==
Despite decades of research, no vaccines currently exist.

Recombinant technology has however been used to target the formation of vaccines for HPIV-1, -2 and -3 and has taken the form of several live-attenuated intranasal vaccines. Two vaccines in particular were found to be immunogenic and well tolerated against HPIV-3 in phase I trials. HPIV-1 and -2 vaccine candidates remain less advanced.

Vaccine techniques which have been used against HPIVs are not limited to intranasal forms, but also viruses attenuated by cold passage, host range attenuation, chimeric construct vaccines and also introducing mutations with the help of reverse genetics to achieve attenuation.

Maternal antibodies may offer some degree of protection against HPIVs during the early stages of life via the colostrum in breast milk.

== Medication ==
Ribavirin is one medication which has shown good potential for the treatment of HPIV-3 given recent in-vitro tests (in-vivo tests show mixed results). Ribavirin is a broad-spectrum antiviral, and as of 2012, was being administered to those who are severely immuno-compromised, despite the lack of conclusive evidence for its benefit. Protein inhibitors and novel forms of medication have also been proposed to relieve the symptoms of infection.

Furthermore, antibiotics may be used if a secondary bacterial infection develops. Corticosteroid treatment and nebulizers are also a first line choice against croup if breathing difficulties ensue.

== Interactions with the environment ==
Parainfluenza viruses last only a few hours in the environment and are inactivated by soap and water. Furthermore, the virus can also be easily destroyed using common hygiene techniques and detergents, disinfectants and antiseptics.

Environmental factors which are important for HPIV survival are pH, humidity, temperature and the medium within which the virus is found. The optimal pH is around the physiologic pH values (7.4 to 8.0), whilst at high temperatures (above 37 °C) and low humidity, infectivity reduces.

The majority of transmission has been linked to close contact, especially in nosocomial infections. Chronic care facilities and doctors' surgeries are also known to be transmission 'hotspots' with transmission occurring via aerosols, large droplets and also fomites (contaminated surfaces).

The exact infectious dose remains unknown, but evidence exists that the infectious dose for hPIV1 is small (80 TCID50 of hPIV1)

== Economic burden ==
In economically disadvantaged regions of the world, HPIV infection can be measured in terms of mortality. In the developed world where mortality remains rare, the economic costs of the infection can be estimated. Estimates from the US are suggestive of a cost (based on extrapolation) in the region of $200 million per annum.

== Differences between influenza and parainfluenza ==
Influenza viruses belong to the Orthomyxoviridae family; Parainfluenza viruses (HPIVs) belong to the Paramyxoviridae family. Influenza typically causes more severe illness than parainfluenza. While both can cause upper respiratory symptoms, influenza is more likely to result in high fever, body aches, and fatigue. Parainfluenza often produces milder, cold-like symptoms such as runny nose, cough, and low-grade fever. Influenza has a distinct seasonal pattern, with outbreaks occurring mainly in winter months. Parainfluenza viruses circulate year-round, with each type having its own seasonal patterns. The viruses have a tendency towards different complications: influenza is more likely to cause severe pneumonia in high-risk groups; parainfluenza is more likely to cause croup in children. Influenza has effective vaccines available and can be treated with antiviral medications like neuraminidase inhibitors. There are currently no vaccines or specific antiviral treatments for parainfluenza viruses. Parainfluenza tends to infect young children, with most children being infected by age 5. Influenza can affect all ages.
