= Nelson Bay orthoreovirus =

Virus classification
- (unranked): Virus
- Realm: Riboviria
- Kingdom: Orthornavirae
- Phylum: Duplornaviricota
- Class: Resentoviricetes
- Order: Reovirales
- Family: Spinareoviridae
- Genus: Orthoreovirus
- Species: Nelson Bay orthoreovirus

Strains
- Pulau virus (PuV)

Synonyms
- Nelson Bay virus

Species of virus

Nelson Bay orthoreovirus, often called Nelson Bay virus (NBV) is a novel double-stranded RNA orthoreovirus species first isolated from a flying fox (Pteropus poliocephalus) near Nelson Bay in New South Wales, Australia.

== Virology ==
=== Genome ===
The NBV has a morphology similar to other orthoreoviruses, but has a much more rapid cytopathic effect.

== See also ==
- Bat virome
- Double-stranded RNA viruses
- Oncolytic virus
- Orphan virus
- Xi River virus
