= Mouyassue virus =

Virus classification
- Group: Group V ((−)ssRNA)
- Order: Bunyavirales
- Family: Hantaviridae
- Genus: Orthohantavirus
- Species: Mouyassue virus

Species of virus

Mouyassue virus is a novel, single-stranded, enveloped, negative-sense RNA orthohantavirus.

== Natural reservoir ==
The banana pipistrelle (Neoromicia nanus) found in the Côte d'Ivoire is the natural reservoir of Mouyassue virus. It shares a common lineage with the Magboi virus (MGBV) found in the hairy slit-faced bat (Nycteris hispida) in Sierra Leone
