= Sclerotinia gemycircularvirus 1 =

Virus classification
- (unranked): Virus
- Realm: Monodnaviria
- Kingdom: Shotokuvirae
- Phylum: Cressdnaviricota
- Class: Repensiviricetes
- Order: Geplafuvirales
- Family: Genomoviridae
- Genus: Gemycircularvirus
- Species: Gemycircularvirus sclero1

Synonyms
- Sclerotinia sclerotiorum hypovirulence associated DNA virus 1

Sclerotinia gemycircularvirus 1 is a single stranded DNA virus with a circular genome that infects the fungus Sclerotinia sclerotiorum. Infection with this virus decreases the virulence of this fungus. The mechanism of this effect is not known.

== Virology ==
The virions are isometric particles, 20–22 nanometers in diameter. The capsid is composed on the viral coat protein (VCP).

== Genome ==
The genome encodes only two proteins—a replicase and the coat protein. The genes are encoded on complementary strands.

== Taxonomy ==
This virus appears to be related to but distinct from members of the Geminiviridae. Unlike geminiviruses, this virus does not have a movement protein. It has been officially classified into the genus Gemycircularvirus within the new family Genomoviridae.
