= Open reading frame =

DNA section marked with start and stop codon of different length

Sample sequence showing three different possible reading frames. Start codons are highlighted in purple, and stop codons are highlighted in red.

In molecular biology and genetics, reading frames are defined as spans of DNA sequence between the start and stop codons. Usually, this is considered within a studied region of a prokaryotic DNA sequence, where only one of the six possible reading frames will be "open" (the "reading", however, refers to the RNA produced by transcription of the DNA and its subsequent interaction with the ribosome in translation). Such an open reading frame (ORF) may contain a start codon (usually AUG in terms of RNA) and by definition cannot extend beyond a stop codon (usually UAA, UAG or UGA in RNA). That start codon (not necessarily the first) indicates where translation may start. The transcription termination site is located after the ORF, beyond the translation stop codon. If transcription were to cease before the stop codon, an incomplete protein would be made during translation.

In eukaryotic genes with multiple exons, introns are removed and exons are then joined together after transcription to yield the final messenger RNA (mRNA) for protein translation. In the context of gene finding, the start-stop definition of an ORF therefore only applies to spliced mRNAs, not genomic DNA, since introns may contain stop codons and/or cause shifts between reading frames. An alternative definition says that an ORF is a sequence that has a length divisible by three and is bounded by stop codons. This more general definition can be useful in the context of transcriptomics and metagenomics, where a start or stop codon may not be present in the obtained sequences. Such an ORF corresponds to parts of a gene rather than the complete gene.

== Significance ==
One common use of open reading frames (ORFs) is as one piece of evidence to assist in gene prediction. Long ORFs are often used, along with other evidence, to initially identify candidate protein-coding regions or functional RNA-coding regions in a DNA sequence. The presence of an ORF does not necessarily mean that the region is always translated. For example, in a randomly generated DNA sequence with an equal percentage of each nucleotide, a stop-codon would be expected once every 21 codons. A simple gene prediction algorithm for prokaryotes might look for a start codon followed by an open reading frame that is long enough to encode a typical protein, where the codon usage of that region matches the frequency characteristic for the given organism's coding regions. Therefore, some authors say that an ORF should have a minimal length, e.g. 100 codons or 150 codons. By itself even a long open reading frame is not conclusive evidence for the presence of a gene.

=== Short open reading frames ===
Some short open reading frames (sORFs), also known as small open reading frames (smORFs), usually < 100 codons in length, that lack the classical hallmarks of protein-coding genes (both from ncRNAs and mRNAs) can produce functional peptides. They encode microproteins or sORF‐encoded proteins (SEPs). The 5'-UTR of about 50% of mammal mRNAs contain one or several sORFs, also called upstream ORFs (uORFs). However, less than 10% of the vertebrate mRNAs surveyed in a 1994 study contained AUG codons in front of the major ORF. uORFs were found in two thirds of proto-oncogenes and related proteins. 64–75% of experimentally found translation initiation sites of sORFs are conserved in the genomes of human and mouse and may indicate that these elements have function. However, sORFs can often be found only in the minor forms of mRNAs and avoid selection; the high conservation of initiation sites may be connected with their location inside promoters of the relevant genes. This is characteristic of SLAMF1 gene, for example.

== Six-frame translation ==
Since DNA is interpreted in groups of three nucleotides (codons), a DNA strand has three distinct reading frames. The double helix of a DNA molecule has two anti-parallel strands; with the two strands having three reading frames each, there are six possible frame translations.

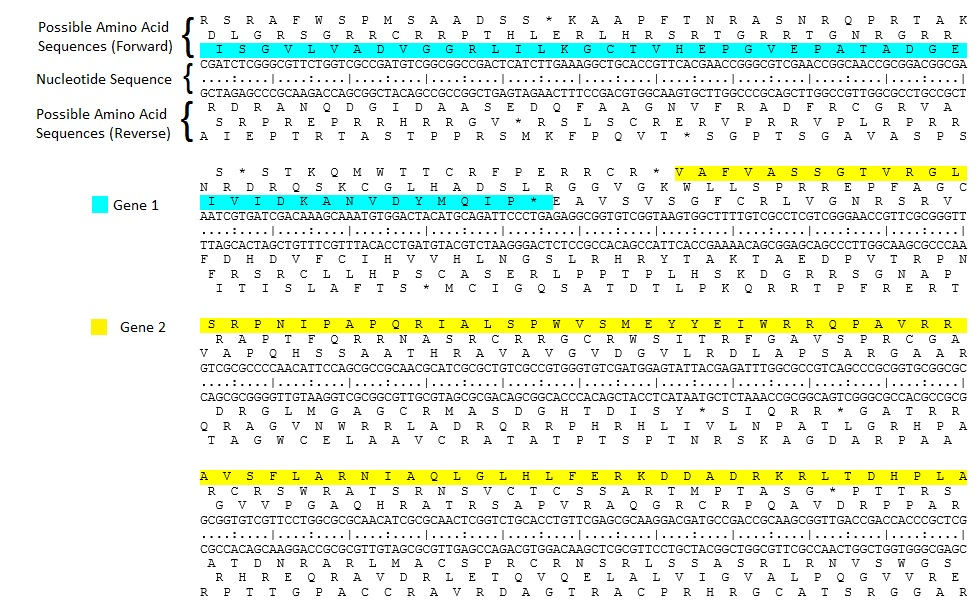
Example of a six-frame translation. The nucleotide sequence is shown in the middle with forward translations above and reverse translations below. Two possible open reading frames with the sequences are highlighted.

== Software ==
=== Finder ===
The ORF Finder (Open Reading Frame Finder) is a graphical analysis tool which finds all open reading frames of a selectable minimum size in a user's sequence or in a sequence already in the database. This tool identifies all open reading frames using the standard or alternative genetic codes. The deduced amino acid sequence can be saved in various formats and searched against the sequence database using the basic local alignment search tool (BLAST) server. The ORF Finder should be helpful in preparing complete and accurate sequence submissions. It is also packaged with the Sequin sequence submission software (sequence analyser).

=== Investigator ===
ORF Investigator is a program which not only gives information about the coding and non coding sequences but also can perform pairwise global alignment of different gene/DNA regions sequences. The tool efficiently finds the ORFs for corresponding amino acid sequences and converts them into their single letter amino acid code, and provides their locations in the sequence. The pairwise global alignment between the sequences makes it convenient to detect the different mutations, including single nucleotide polymorphism. Needleman–Wunsch algorithms are used for the gene alignment. The ORF Investigator is written in the portable Perl programming language, and is therefore available to users of all common operating systems.

=== Predictor ===
OrfPredictor is a web server designed for identifying protein-coding regions in expressed sequence tag (EST)-derived sequences. For query sequences with a hit in BLASTX, the program predicts the coding regions based on the translation reading frames identified in BLASTX alignments, otherwise, it predicts the most probable coding region based on the intrinsic signals of the query sequences. The output is the predicted peptide sequences in the FASTA format, and a definition line that includes the query ID, the translation reading frame and the nucleotide positions where the coding region begins and ends. OrfPredictor facilitates the annotation of EST-derived sequences, particularly, for large-scale EST projects.

ORF Predictor uses a combination of the two different ORF definitions mentioned above. It searches stretches starting with a start codon and ending at a stop codon. As an additional criterion, it searches for a stop codon in the 5' untranslated region (UTR or NTR, nontranslated region). The OrfPredictor web server was not further supported, the standalone OrfPredictor tool can be downloaded at the following site (http://bioinformatics.ysu.edu/publication/tools_download/).

=== ORFik ===
ORFik is a R-package in Bioconductor for finding open reading frames and using Next generation sequencing technologies for justification of ORFs.

=== orfipy ===
orfipy is a tool written in Python / Cython to extract ORFs in an extremely and fast and flexible manner. orfipy can work with plain or gzipped FASTA and FASTQ sequences, and provides several options to fine-tune ORF searches; these include specifying the start and stop codons, reporting partial ORFs, and using custom translation tables. The results can be saved in multiple formats, including the space-efficient BED format. orfipy is particularly faster for data containing multiple smaller FASTA sequences, such as de-novo transcriptome assemblies.

== See also ==
- Coding region
- Putative gene
- Sequerome – A sequence profiling tool that links each BLAST record to the NCBI ORF enabling complete ORF analysis of a BLAST report.
- Micropeptide
