= Bat mumps virus =

Virus classification
- (unranked): Virus
- Realm: Riboviria
- Kingdom: Orthornavirae
- Phylum: Negarnaviricota
- Class: Monjiviricetes
- Order: Mononegavirales
- Family: Paramyxoviridae
- Genus: Orthorubulavirus
- Species: Orthorubulavirus parotitidis
- Virus: Bat mumps virus

Synonyms
- Bat mumps orthorubulavirus; Bat mumps rubulavirus

Species of virus

Bat mumps virus (BMV) is a member of genus Orthorubulavirus, family Paramyxoviridae, and order Mononegavirales. Paramyxoviridae viruses were first isolated from bats using heminested PCR with degenerate primers. This process was then followed by Sanger sequencing. A specific location of this virus is not known because it was isolated from bats worldwide. Although multiple paramyxoviridae viruses have been isolated worldwide, BMV specifically has not been isolated thus far. However, BMV was detected in African fruit bats, but no infectious form has been isolated to date. It is known that BMV is transmitted through saliva in the respiratory system of bats. While the virus was considered its own species for a few years, phylogenetic analysis has since shown that it is a member of Orthorubulavirus parotitidis.

== Classification ==
The Paramyxoviridae family can be divided in several genera, including Orthorubulavirus. The Orthorubulavirus genus can then be divided into two main groups, based on the type of pathogen. Orthorubulavirus contains human pathogens, as well as bat-borne pathogens. Examples of the human viruses include the following: parainfluenza virus (hPIV) and mumps virus (MuV), and examples of the bat-borne viruses are: Mapuera (MapV), Bat mumps virus (BMV), and Menangle (MenPV).

== Virus structure ==
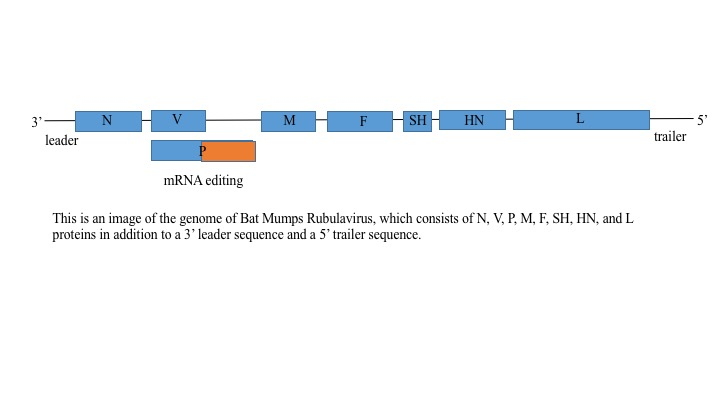
This is an image of the genome of Bat mumps virus, which consists of N, V, P, M, F, SH, HN, and L proteins in addition to a 3-inch leader sequence and a 5-inch trailer sequence.

Bat mumps virus (BMV) is a spherical shaped negative sense single stranded RNA virus. Some researchers have noted a pleomorphic structure. BMV is about 15kb in size, with a diameter of about 150nm. This virus also contains an envelope, derived from the host cell. In addition, the virus has cell attachment glycoprotein, important in mediating viral entry, with neuraminidase and haemagglutinin capability. A ribonucleocapsid is present inside the virus.

== Virus genome ==
The BMV is composed of a linear genome, with a monopartite segmentation, meaning there is a single molecule of nucleic acid, as opposed to multiple molecules. In other words, the genome is non-segmented since it only has the one molecule. Because of this, the genome cannot undergo generic reassortment, so no antigenic shift can occur. RNA-dependent RNA polymerase does not have a function to be able to check for errors in coding, so many mutations are possible in the transcription process. It was initially assumed by researchers that antigenic stability would not be possible due to having these mechanisms occurring, but it has been noted that there is antigenic stability due to the fact that there are so many proteins, each having their own roles. So, any mutation would lead to a reduced ability to function, then creating a less efficient virus, which is not favorable for the virus.

BMV encodes a nucleoprotein, encoded by gene N; a phosphoprotein, encoded by gene P; a V protein, a matrix protein, encoded by M; a fusion protein, encoded by F; and a large polymerase subunit, encoded by L. In addition, the unedited P gene contains the V protein. The order from left to right is the leader region, followed by the nucleocapsid, then the phosphoprotein, then the matrix protein, followed by the fusion protein, then the large polymerase, and finally the trailer sequence. The addition of 2 non-templated G residues of the RNA-dependent RNA polymerase is necessary for expressing the phosphoprotein, in order for viral replication and synthesis to occur since it is a negative single-stranded RNA virus. BMV (as well as a parainfluenza virus known as PIV5) contain short hydrophobic proteins, which have a role in blocking the TNFalpha-mediated apoptosis pathway. In terms of gene expression, the viral RNA-dependent RNA polymerase binds the encapsulated genome at the leader region, which starts the transcription process. The 3’ leader sequence is approximately 50 nucleotides in length, and this is the area acting as the transcriptional promoter. The 5’ trailer sequence (at the opposite end of the leader sequence) is between 50 and 161 nucleotides in length. There are intergenomic regions between each gene, which are usually between 1 and 56 nucleotides long for BMV. mRNAs are capped and polyadenylated by the L protein, and the V protein is created through editing the P mRNA gene, as mentioned earlier.

== Virus replication cycle and interaction with the host ==
The replication cycle for BMV has not been studied; however, the replication cycle of the viruses in Orthorubulavirus as a whole has been studied, so the information listed below is regarding the entire genus. The replication cycle is cytoplasmic.

== Entry into cell ==
In order for the virus to enter into a host cell, it must first attach on to the host cell's receptors. This process is done using the glycoprotein structure that the virus contains. The specific receptors used in this process for BMV are unknown, but it has been noted that the BMV virus attaches to the host cell surface receptors via the HN glycoprotein. This is done by using the neuraminidase and haemagglutinin capability, as described above. BMV requires the expression of sialic acids on its surface of target cells and the F protein must be cleaved in order for host cell binding, and then entry can occur. Next, fusion with the plasma membrane occurs, and the ribonucleocapsid from inside the virus is released into the cytoplasm of the host cell.

== Replication and transcription ==
It is in the cytoplasm, and at this point in the replication process, that the viral mRNAs are capped and polyadenylated. This can be called sequential transcription. It should also be noted that the purpose of the polyadenylation is to increase the half-life of the protein in order to increase the regulation of the activity. The RNA-dependent RNA polymerase binds to the RNA genome in order for this transcription to occur.

== Assembly and release ==
Further, assembly of the virus begins when there is enough nucleoprotein (N) present to encapsulate neo-synthesized antigenomes and genomes. The virus, or more specifically, the ribonucleocapsid, interacts with the matrix (M) protein in the plasma membrane. Next, budding occurs via the ESCRT complex, and the virion is released at this point in the replication cycle.

== Associated diseases ==
The bat mumps virus was first isolated from a fruit bat in the Democratic Republic of Congo and is closely related to the mumps virus in the Orthorubulavirus genus. Some paramyxoviruses have been discovered to have the ability to affect humans, so there is high zoonotic potential that BMV can affect humans due to the similarity between that and the human mumps virus. Specifically, the fusion protein and hemagglutinin and neuraminidase proteins of the envelope have been recognized to be similar, both serologically and functionally, between the two viruses. These proteins are the targets of the neutralizing antibodies, and due to the similarities between the two viruses, there is cross-neutralization. Neutralizing antibodies are important in protecting against the virus, and it has been noted that people who have antibodies from a vaccine or infection of human mumps virus are able to neutralize the bat-borne mumps virus in an efficient manner. In other words, the vaccine for human mumps appears to reduce the risk of infection from the bat mumps virus.

== Tropism ==
Tropism in bats for BMV has not been specifically studied thus far. However, it is known that Bat mumps virus initially infects the respiratory system in bats. Although no studies on bats have been completed, it is known that the bat mumps virus is closely related to the human mumps virus. So, the following information is regarding the human mumps virus, but can potentially be applied to BMV. Mumps typically infects the respiratory system first, in addition to causing inflammation in the parotid glands. It can also cause orchitis in men, and meningitis, pancreatitis, and deafness in some cases. A number of individuals infected with mumps can be asymptomatic as well. Other symptoms can sometimes include fatigue, joint or muscle pain, and loss of appetite. Other possible mammalian host cells can include those of apes, pigs, and dogs, in addition to humans.

== Outbreaks ==
Since there is the potential for Bat mumps virus to infect humans, it is unclear how much BMV has contributed to the human mumps cases in recent years. There is no evidence of recent outbreaks of BMV in bats, but it is possible this virus has contributed to the large number of outbreaks of mumps in humans. Outbreaks of human mumps have been on the rise in recent years since 2016, being higher than any numbers since 2006. Outbreaks were present in states such as Washington, New York, Oklahoma, Indiana, and some counties in Michigan. An increase in the human population has been noted to be a factor in the possibility of BMV having spillover into humans. As the population grows and humans build on new land, there is the possibility of having contact of land that has been infested by bats infected with BMV. Consumption of ecological resources can almost ensure that we will continue to see spillovers of zoonotic viruses from animal hosts, including that of BMV from fruit bats.
