= Entebbe bat virus =

Virus classification
- (unranked): Virus
- Realm: Riboviria
- Kingdom: Orthornavirae
- Phylum: Kitrinoviricota
- Class: Flasuviricetes
- Order: Amarillovirales
- Family: Flaviviridae
- Genus: Orthoflavivirus
- Subgenus: Euflavivirus
- Species: Orthoflavivirus entebbeense

Species of virus

Entebbe bat virus is an infectious disease caused by a Flavivirus that is closely related to yellow fever.

Little is known about the symptoms caused by the Entebbe bat virus, and it is unknown if the virus can infect humans. Entebbe bat virus was initially a mosquito-borne pathogen that was able to infect bats and use them as reservoirs for the virus. However, the virus does not seem to have any existing adverse side effects on its host.

Entebbe bat virus was first isolated from a little free-tailed bat (Chaerephon pumilus) in Uganda in 1957, but was not detectable after initial isolation. In 2011, Entebbe bat virus was isolated from a free-tailed bat captured from the attic of a house where it had been originally found. Infectious virus was recovered from the spleen and lung. The viral RNA was sequenced and compared with that of the original isolate (Kading et al. 2015).

Entebbe bat virus is a (+) single-stranded RNA (ssRNA) genome virus. It is an enveloped virus with icosahedral nucleocapsid. Its genome has approximately 10,000 to 12,000 kilobases.

== Viral structure ==
Not much is known about the structure of Entebbe Bat Virus; however, the virus is very similar to the Yellow Fever Virus. Since Entebbe Bat Virus is in the Genus Flavivirus, the structure is icosahedral-like with a pseudo T=3 symmetry with a diameter of approximately 50 nm. The capsid protein is enveloped. The genomic arrangement is a linear (+)ssRNA. Its genomic segmentation is Monopartite (Flint).

== Viral genome ==
The genome of Entebbe Bat Virus is a (+) single-stranded RNA ((+)ssRNA) with a linear characteristic to it. The genome encodes 3 structural proteins (Capsid, prM, and Envelope) and 8 non-structural proteins (NS1, NS2A, NS2B, NS3, NS4A, NS4B, NS5 and NS5B).

The genomic RNA is modified at the 5′ end of positive-strand genomic RNA with a cap-1 structure. The (+)ssRNA does not have a poly-A tail, and it possesses a UTR promoter site on the 5’ end and the 3’ end if its RNA genome.

== Replication ==
=== Entry into cell ===
Entebbe Bat Virus is an enveloped virus, which means that it has to bind its envelope proteins to a cell surface protein on the cell that it's going to infect. In flavivirus virions, the fusion peptide is buried in dimmers of the fusion glycoprotein E. At low pH, the dimmers are disrupted, the proteins rotate to form trimers, and the fusion peptide is directed toward the cell membrane The viral envelope protein E attaches to host receptors, which mediates receptor-mediated endocytosis.. The viral nucleocapsid, as RNP, is released into the cytoplasm, where the RNA synthesis begins. The mechanism by which the contacts between the viral nucleocapsid and M protein, which forms a shell beneath the lipid bilayer, are broken to facilitate release of the nucleocapsid is not known (Flint).

==== Replication and transcription ====
Since Entebbe Bat Virus is in the family Flaviviridae, and has a (+) ssRNA genome, it must have the same replication process as those in the family of Flavivirdae. Entebbe Bat Virus replicates in the cytoplasm of the host cells. The genome is similar to host cellular mRNA except that the viral (+)ssRNA is missing the poly-A tail. Lacking a poly-A tail allows the virus to use cellular machinery to synthesize its genome and the proteins it needs Moreover, the genome encodes 3 structural proteins (Capsid, prM, and Envelope) and 8 non-structural proteins (NS1, NS2A, NS2B, NS3, NS4A, NS4B, NS5 and NS5B). The genomic RNA is modified at the 5′ end of positive-strand genomic RNA with a cap-1 structure.

Cellular RNA cap structures are formed with the action of an RNA triphosphatase, with guanylyltransferase, N7-methyltransferase and 2′-O methyltransferase. These are products of viral transcription. The NS3 protein encodes a RNA triphosphatase within its helicase domain. It uses the helicase ATP hydrolysis site to remove the γ-phosphate from the 5′ end of the RNA. The N-terminal domain of the NS5 is vital in producing mature RNA. RNA binding affinity is reduced by the presence of ATP or GTP and enhanced by S-adenosyl methionine (Henderson et al. 2011).

===== Assembly and release =====
Once translated, the polyprotein is cleaved by a combination of viral and host proteases to release mature polypeptides. However, since cellular mRNAs need a poly-A tail to be considered mature. Therefore, the virus produces a polyprotein that is able to cut the translated viral polypeptide. The polyprotein contains an autocatalytic feature which automatically releases the first peptide, which is an enzyme. This enzyme is then able to cleave the remaining polyprotein. One of the products cleaved is a polymerase, responsible for the synthesis of a (-)ssRNA molecule. The newly produced (-)ssRNA will act as a template to construct (+)ssRNA, which will be the genome for the new virion particles (Flint).

Flavivirus genomic RNA replication occurs on rough endoplasmic reticulum membranes.

New viral particles are assembled. This occurs during the budding process which is important to produce the lipid envelope that will envelop that newly produced virion particle and cell lysis.

== Associated viruses ==
Viruses that are associated with Entebbe Bat Virus are Sokolul Virus and Yokose Virus. Both of those viruses are categorized underneath the Entebbe Virus. Moreover, those two viruses do not have an arthropod vector as most of the viruses in the family Flaviviridae do.

== Tropism ==
The infection of a bat with Entebbe Bat Virus is unknown due to the fact that it no longer needs a vector of transfer. The Entebbe Bat Virus has been located in only two cell types, and those cell types are found in the lungs and spleen.
