= Magboi virus =

Virus classification
- Group: Group V ((−)ssRNA)
- Order: Bunyavirales
- Family: Hantaviridae
- Genus: Orthohantavirus
- Species: Magboi virus

Species of virus

Magboi virus (MGBV) is a novel, bat-borne Orthohantavirus discovered in a slit-faced bat trapped near the Magboi Stream in eastern Sierra Leone in 2011. It is a single-stranded, negative sense, RNA virus in the Bunyavirales order.

== Molecular virology ==
The discovery represented the first time a hantavirus was detected in a bat, although bats as a reservoir for hantavirus had been long suspected. On the basis of a maximum-likelihood phylogenetic tree, the sequence isolated from the Magboi River bat does not cluster with rodent-associated hantaviruses but groups with those found in shrews and moles. This raises the question of the real hantavirus host range. Bats are already known to harbor a broad variety of emerging pathogens, including other bunyaviruses. Their ability to fly and social life history enable efficient pathogen maintenance, evolution, and spread.

== See also ==
- Sangassou virus
- Bat-borne virus
