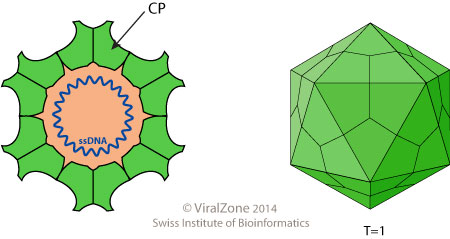

Virus classification
- (unranked): Virus
- Realm: Floreoviria
- Kingdom: Shotokuvirae
- Phylum: Cressdnaviricota
- Class: Repensiviricetes
- Order: Geplafuvirales
- Family: Genomoviridae

= Genomoviridae =

Family of viruses

Genomoviridae is a family of single stranded DNA viruses that mainly infect fungi. The genomes of this family are small (2.2–2.4 kilobases in length). The genomes are circular single-stranded DNA and encode rolling-circle replication initiation proteins (Rep) and unique capsid proteins. In Rep-based phylogenies, genomoviruses form a sister clade to plant viruses of the family Geminiviridae. Ten genera are recognized in this family.

The family name is an acronym derived from geminivirus-like, no movement protein.

The genus name Gemycircularvirus stands for Gemini-like myco-infecting circular virus. Sclerotinia sclerotiorum hypovirulence associated DNA virus 1 (ssHADV-1), of the genus Gemycircularvirus, was the first cultivated member of the family. Most other genomoviruses are uncultivated and have been discovered using metagenomics techniques, although more genomoviruses are being isolated as interest grows.

== Taxonomy ==
The genera in this family are:

- Gemycircularvirus
- Gemyduguivirus
- Gemygorvirus
- Gemykibivirus
- Gemykolovirus
- Gemykrogvirus
- Gemykroznavirus
- Gemytondvirus
- Gemytripvirus
- Gemyvongvirus

== Virology ==
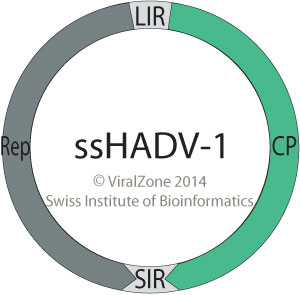
Genome map of ssHADV-1

These viruses have circular single-stranded genomes of 2.1–2.2 kilobases in length. All but one genomovirids contain monopartite genomes, whereas the genome of Fusarium graminearum gemytripvirus 1 (genus Gemytripvirus) consists of three segments. The monopartite genomes encode two proteins—a Rep (replicator) and a CP (capsid) protein. The Rep protein is most closely similar to the Rep protein of the Geminiviridae. In contrast, the CP protein shows no homology to the CP of geminiviruses.
