= Yokose virus =

Virus classification
- (unranked): Virus
- Realm: Riboviria
- Kingdom: Orthornavirae
- Phylum: Kitrinoviricota
- Class: Flasuviricetes
- Order: Amarillovirales
- Family: Flaviviridae
- Genus: Orthoflavivirus
- Subgenus: Euflavivirus
- Species: Orthoflavivirus yokoseense

Synonyms.
- Yokase virus

Species of virus

Yokose virus (YOKV) is in the genus Orthoflavivirus of the family Flaviviridae. Viruses in Flaviviridae are often found in arthropods, such as mosquitoes and ticks, and may also infect humans. The genus Orthoflavivirus includes over 50 known viruses, including Yellow Fever, West Nile Virus, Zika Virus, and Japanese Encephalitis. Yokose virus is a new member of the flavivirus family that has only been identified in a few bat species. Bats have been associated with several emerging zoonotic diseases such as Ebola and SARS.

== Viral classification ==
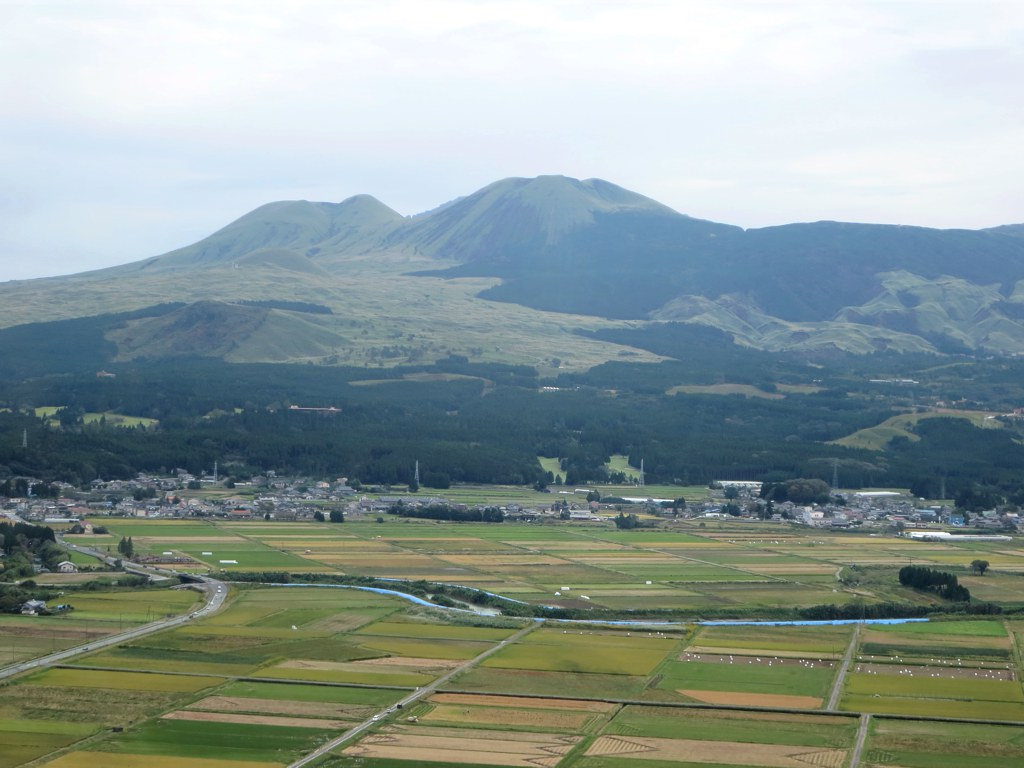
A picture of Mount Also, located on Kyushu Island Japan, where Yokose virus was first isolated

Yokose virus belongs to the genus Orthoflavivirus of the family Flaviviridae. It was identified in 1971 in Oita prefecture, Kyushu Island, Japan. The strain Oita-36 was isolated from bat species Miniopterus fuliginosus. Molecular genetic analysis has shown that Yokose virus is a new member of the Orthoflavivirus genus. Flaviviruses are typically divided into three groups: mosquito borne, tick borne, or non-vector. Yokose virus is classified as NKV, or no-known vector. This means that it has no known arthropod vector. However, there is some evidence suggests that it may infect arthropods, namely being mediated by mosquitos. Yokose virus has been found to be genetically close to Yellow Fever virus with amino acid sequences showing close identify to Entebbe Bat virus.

== Viral structure and genome ==
Yokose virus is a positive sense single-stranded RNA virus. It is enveloped and has icosahedral symmetry with a triangulation number (T) of 3. It is roughly 50 nm in diameter. The genome is non-segmented and contains 10,857 nucleotides. There is one open reading frame (ORF) of 3425 amino acid polyprotein that encodes three structural proteins and eight non-structural proteins. The structural proteins include capsid (C), premembrane/membrane (prM), and envelope (E). The non-structural proteins include NS1, NS2A, NS2B, NS3, NS4A, 2K, NS4B, and NS5. Protein 2K is not found in many other flaviviruses. NS3 functions as a protease and helicase. NS5 functions as the RNA-dependent RNA polymerase. NS1 is important in the viral replication process. NS2A interacts with NS3 and NS5, helps in viral assembly and recruits the viral RNA genome to membrane-bound replication complex. Secondary structures formed by 5' and 3' of non-translating region (NTR) influence transcription and translation. Yokose virus has a CS1 motif in the 3' NTR which is conserved in mosquito-borne flaviviruses suggesting ability to infect arthropods.

== Replication cycle ==
=== Entry into cell ===
The viral envelope protein (E) attaches to the host cell receptors and is taken into the cell via endocytosis. The envelope protein then undergoes a conformational change within the endosome upon exposure to the endosome's acidic nature. The envelope protein and the endosomal membrane fuse, and the virus is released into the cytoplasm.

=== Replication and transcription ===
The viral RNA is translated into a polyprotein and then cleaved by viral and cellular proteases into the structural (C, prM, and E) and non-structural proteins (NS1, NS2A, NS2B, NS3, NS4A, 2K, NS4B, and NS5). Replication takes places on the surface of the endoplasmic reticulum within the membrane vessicles. A complementary negative sense RNA strand is formed via the RNA-dependent RNA polymerase (non-structural protein NS5) to create a double-stranded RNA. The dsRNA is transcribed producing viral mRNAs.

=== Assembly and release ===
The virus is assembled within the endoplasmic reticulum. A nucleocapsid is formed and takes up viral glycoproteins. However, very little is understood about the assembly process of flaviviruses. Evidence suggests that several of the non-structural proteins such as NS2A contributes to assembly. The assembled vision then buds to the Golgi apparatus where the prM protein is cleaved leading to maturation. The virus is then released from the cell via exocytosis and is off to infect other host cells.

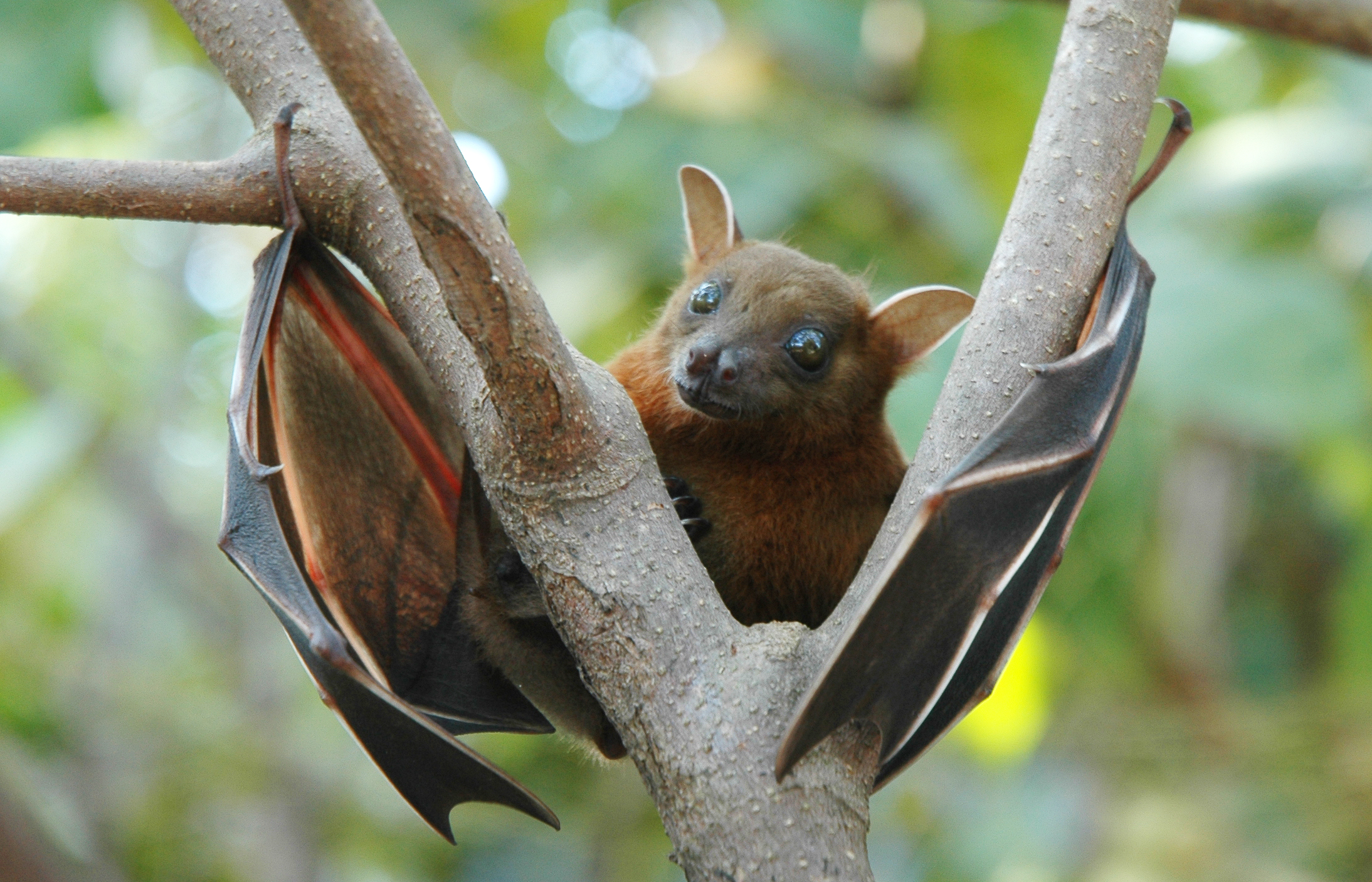
A fruit bat from the area where Yokose virus antibodies have been found in fruit bats

== Host and location ==
Much is unknown about the pathogenicity and virulence of Yokose virus including in bats. The strain XYBX1332 isolated in China was found to cause cytopathic effects in mammalian cells. In the study of fruit bats infected with Yokose virus, they did not observe any clinical signs of disease.

Currently only species of bats have been identified of carrying Yokose viral strains. The strain Oita-36 was isolated from bat species Miniopterus fuliginosus and is currently the primary strain of Yokose virus. It was identified on Kyushu Island off the coast of Japan. Yokose virus is not geographically limited to Japanese islands, but has been isolated in inland China as well. Strain XYBX1332 was isolated from bat species Myotis daubentonii in Yunnan Province, China. However, this strain has genomic differences compared to the original Oita-36 strain and further research should be conducted to conclude if it is a new species of flavivirus. Antibodies to Yokose virus were found in fruit bats, Rousettus leschenaultii, in the Philippines and Malaysia as well. This shows that Yokose virus is not geographically limited to Japanese islands, but can exist in inland areas of Asia as well.

So far there has been no reported infections of Yokose virus in humans or other animals. Researchers found that Yokose can be manipulated to infect human cells and reacts to antibodies of other Flavivirus present within the cells. It was found that Yellow fever vaccination was effective in neutralizing Yokose virus in human cells.

== Pathogenicity and virulence ==
Much is unknown about the pathogenicity and virulence of Yokose virus. The strain XYBX1332 isolated in China was found to cause cytopathic effects in mammalian cells. In the study of fruit bats infected with Yokose virus, they did not observe any clinical signs of disease. However, a study conducted on bat alveolar epithelial cells and kidney cells found that infection of Yokose virus led to viral replication and cell death shortly after.
