= Sosuga pararubulavirus =

Virus classification
- (unranked): Virus
- Realm: Riboviria
- Kingdom: Orthornavirae
- Phylum: Negarnaviricota
- Class: Monjiviricetes
- Order: Mononegavirales
- Family: Paramyxoviridae
- Genus: Pararubulavirus
- Species: Sosuga pararubulavirus

Synonyms
- Sosuga rubulavirus

Species of virus

Sosuga pararubulavirus is a species of Paramyxovirus which is transmissible to humans. The Egyptian fruit bat is thought to be a natural reservoir species for the virus.

== History ==
In August 2012, following a six-week field trip to South Sudan and Uganda to collect bats and rodents, an American wildlife biologist became ill with symptoms including fever, malaise, headache, pain, stiffness in the neck, and a sore throat. Upon her return to the US, she was admitted to hospital, where she soon developed a maculopapular rash and oropharyngeal ulceration. Several suspect infections, including Ebola and Marburg, were ruled out through standard diagnostic testing. Genetic sequencing identified a novel virus. To determine the source, tissue samples collected during the three-week period prior to the illness were tested for this new Sosuga virus, and several Egyptian fruit bats were found to be positive. Analysis of historical samples of these bats from sites in Uganda found additional positive individuals, suggesting that this species may be a natural reservoir for Sosuga.

== Treatment ==
Research has identified several compounds which inhibit replication of the Sosuga virus.
