= Blue eye disease =

Porcine orthorubulavirus

Virus classification
- (unranked): Virus
- Realm: Riboviria
- Kingdom: Orthornavirae
- Phylum: Negarnaviricota
- Class: Monjiviricetes
- Order: Mononegavirales
- Family: Paramyxoviridae
- Genus: Orthorubulavirus
- Species: Porcine orthorubulavirus

Member virus
- La-Piedad-Michoacan-Mexico virus

Disease

Blue eye disease is caused by La Piedad Michoacán Mexico virus (LPMV), the only member virus of the species Porcine orthorubulavirus in the Paramyxoviridae family. Synonyms for the disease include "Blue Eye Syndrome" and "Porcine Paramyxovirus Blue Eye Disease", and "La Piedad Michoacán Paramyxovirus Infection".

Blue eye disease is a viral disease that is commonly identified by encephalitis, pneumonia, and respiratory diseases in piglets. It also causes reproductive failure in adult pigs, and rarely identifies with corneal opacity, an eye disorder characterized by scarring of the cornea.

== Signs and diagnosis ==
Blue eye disease typically begins in piglets that are between 2–21 days old; 90 percent of the pigs that become infected with the disease die. It usually begins with a sudden onset of fever, arched back, or depression. The disease then progresses with neurological symptoms including weakness, ataxia, muscle tremors, abnormal posture, and rigidity of the hind legs. Some other symptoms associated with this disease are conjunctivitis, blindness, nystagmus, constipation, and diarrhea. Younger pigs can show neurological and respiratory signs which can be quite severe. Mature pigs may show blueing of the pupils in their eyes and experience reproductive difficulties.

Adults of both sexes may become infertile and sows may suffer from abortions and stillbirths.

- Inappetence
- Corneal opacity – conjunctivitis
- Nervous signs – fits and convulsions
- Dog sitting position
- Fever
- Increased returns
- Increased weaning to mating intervals
- Stillbirths
- Mummified piglets
- High mortality in piglets
- Swollen testicles
- Loss of libido

== Cause ==
Blue eye disease is caused by the porcine rubulavirus, which first emerged in 1980 throughout parts of Mexico, including La Piedad, Michoacan, Jalisco, and Guanajuato.

The virus is transmitted directly and indirectly by fomites and birds and can be found throughout the body, including neurons and most soft tissues.

== Diagnosis ==
Blue eye disease outbreaks can happen throughout the year but are most common during spring and summer months of April to July. The mortality rate usually rises and falls and between a two- to nine-week time frame. After the epidemic subsides, no more cases occur unless new susceptible pigs are introduced into the farm. In severe outbreaks of the disease a presumptive diagnosis can be made. Serological testing via virus neutralization and haemagglutination inhibition testing can be performed to diagnose the disease. Virus isolation from tissue samples is also possible.

Necropsy findings can help confirm the diagnosis.

== Epidemiology ==
Blue eye disease in swine has only been reported in Mexico.

It can affect not only pigs but also dogs, cats, rats, and rabbits.

== Treatment and control ==
There is no treatment for the disease. Symptomatic treatment for the inflammatory and respiratory signs can be given, but severe cases may require euthanasia.

General biosecurity protocols including adequate quarantine, testing, and disinfection can help prevent the entry or spread of the disease into a herd.
