= Orphan virus =

Species of virus

An orphan virus is a virus that is not associated with a disease but may possess pathogenicity.

Gilbert Dalldorf, a pathologist who showed that Coxsackie viruses paralyze mice but not humans, indicated that the term ‘orphan’ was created "in a moment of conviviality" by a group of virologists.

Many enteroviruses are referred to as ECHO, enteric cytopathic human orphan viruses, because they were originally not associated with any disease.

== See also ==
- Novel virus
- Reoviridae
- Viral metagenomics
