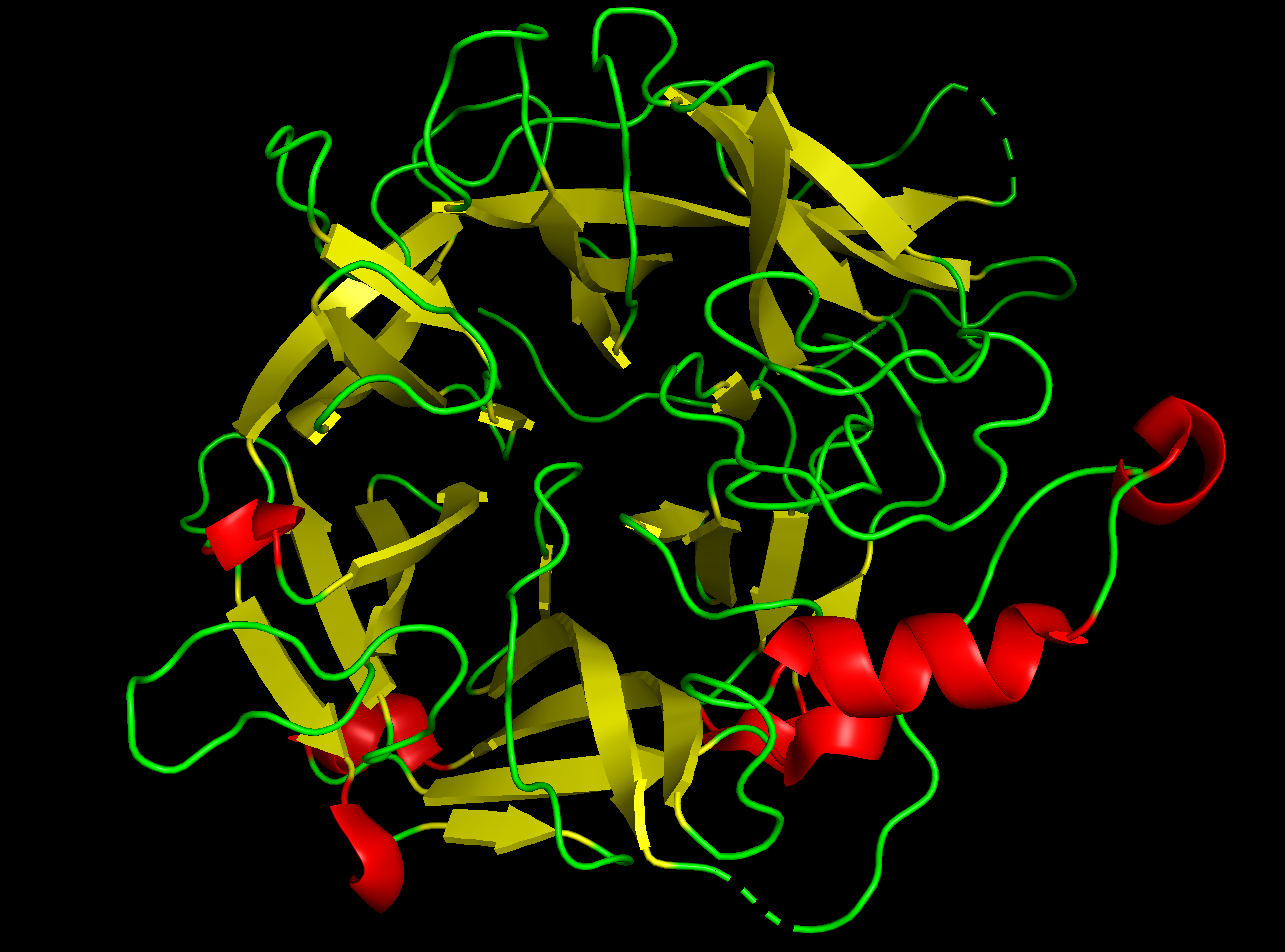
- Structure of MojV-G glycoprotein

Virus classification
- (unranked): Virus
- Realm: Riboviria
- Kingdom: Orthornavirae
- Phylum: Negarnaviricota
- Class: Monjiviricetes
- Order: Mononegavirales
- Family: Paramyxoviridae
- Genus: Parahenipavirus
- Species: Parahenipavirus mojiangense

Synonyms
- Mòjiāng Paramyxovirus; Mòjiāng Henipa-like virus; Mojiang henipavirus

= Mòjiāng virus =

Species of virus

Mòjiāng virus (MojV), scientific name Parahenipavirus mojiangense, is a virus in the family Paramyxoviridae. Antibodies raised against Mòjiāng virus glycoproteins are serologically distinct from other henipaviruses (among which higher cross-reactivity is observed).

== Discovery ==
In the spring of 2012, three miners working in an abandoned copper mine in Mojiang Hani Autonomous County, south China, developed fatal pneumonia. Samples were brought to the Wuhan Institute of Virology where Shi Zhengli and her colleagues ran PCR tests and found that the samples were not the bat coronavirus Rp3 nor SARS-CoV2.

Mammal species present in the cave, including Rhinolophus ferrumequinum, Rattus flavipectus, and Crocidura dracula, were tested for infectious virus and viral RNA. There were 38 sequence reads obtained that were closely related to members of the Henipavirus genus. Infectious virus could only be recovered from four samples of R. flavipectus and were cultured in Vero E6, BHK-21, and HEp-2 cells. While no person-to-person transmission was documented, the full range of mammalian hosts susceptible Mòjiāng virus is unknown. While Hendra, Nipah, Cedar, Kumasi, and Madagascar henipaviruses are known to be harbored among chiropterans, primarily Pteropus spp, MojV is the only henipavirus believed to be found primarily in rodents.

== Virology ==
The cell surface receptor for Mòjiāng virus remains unknown. Unlike Henipavirus members, Mòjiāng virus does not bind Ephrin B2/B3. The Mòjiāng virus attachment glycoprotein (MojV-G) lacks an Ephrin B2/B3 binding site and does not bind other common paramyxovirus receptors, including sialic acid or CD150, in cell culture. MojV-G is the most divergent gene, with less than 50% sequence to HeV-G. This makes MojV-G as divergent from HNV-G as HNV-G is as divergent from the morbillivirus attachment glycoprotein.

== See also ==
- RaTG13, a SARS-like betacoronavirus discovered in 2013 in bat droppings from a mining cave in Mojiang County
