= Langya =

Langya may refer to:

== Places ==
- Mount Langya (Anhui) (琅琊山), Anhui, China
  - Langya District (琅琊区), Chuzhou, Anhui, China, named after Mount Langya within its jurisdiction
  - Langya Temple (琅琊寺), Buddhist temple on Mount Langya, Anhui, China
- Mount Langya (Hebei) (狼牙山), Hebei, China
- Langya, Zhejiang (琅琊镇), town in Zhejiang, China
- Langya Commandery (琅邪郡, 琅琊郡), historical commandery in Shandong, China

== Other uses ==
- Nirvana in Fire (Chinese: 琅琊榜; pinyin: Lángyá bǎng), 2015 Chinese historical drama TV series
- Nirvana in Fire 2, 2017 sequel to Nirvana in Fire
- Langya henipavirus (LayV), a species of henipavirus first detected in the Chinese provinces of Shandong and Henan
