= Madagascar henipavirus =

Virus classification
- (unranked): Virus
- Realm: Riboviria
- Kingdom: Orthornavirae
- Phylum: Negarnaviricota
- Class: Monjiviricetes
- Order: Mononegavirales
- Family: Paramyxoviridae
- Genus: Henipavirus
- Serotype: Madagascar henipavirus

Henipavirus type

Madagascar henipavirus (MadV) is a poorly characterized henipavirus type. Currently it has only been detected serologically among Madagascan rousettes. High cross reactivity was observed with Hendra and Nipah henipaviruses.
