= Paramyxovirus =

Paramyxovirus can refer to two different groups of viruses:

- a member of the family Paramyxoviridae can be called a paramyxovirus (no italics)
- the genus Respirovirus was known as Paramyxovirus (with italics) until 1998
