= 2022 Langya virus outbreak in China =

2018-22 China Langya virus outbreak
- Disease: Langya henipavirus
- Pathogen: LayV
- Source: Transmitted from shrews
- Location: China
- First outbreak: Shandong, China
- Date: 2018 – ongoing?
- Confirmed cases: 35
- Deaths: 0

A possibly ongoing outbreak of Langya henipavirus (LayV) was reported in China in August 2022, with 35 identified cases spanning from 2018 to August 2022. The index case was a 53-year-old female farmer who had been in contact with shrews and presented with a fever, headache, cough and nausea in Qingdao city. The virus was named "Langya" after the hometown of the index patient in Shandong.

The virus does not appear to spread easily from person to person, consistent with the 35 reported cases being apparently independent from one another. In 26 of the 35 human cases reported in China, the only identified infectious agent was LayV; in the LayV-only cases, symptoms appeared such as fever, fatigue, and coughing. No deaths due to LayV had been reported as of August 2022.

LayV infection is a respiratory zoonotic disease which has been shown to be present in goats and dogs, where shrews appear to be a viral reservoir species. LayV is closely related to Hendra virus and Nipah virus, both of which cause respiratory infections that can be fatal, and both of which show low person-to-person transmissibility. The exact method of transmission between animals and from animal to person remains unknown. The closest viral strain match to LayV is Mojiang henipavirus (MojV), discovered in 2012 in rats in southern China and responsible for several fatal respiratory infections.

Initial detection of the virus was made during an infection surveillance study at three hospitals in Eastern China involving patients exhibiting a fever. The Taiwan Centers for Disease Control said they would monitor the virus closely and establish a genome sequencing method to identify the virus.
