= Cedar virus =

Virus classification
- (unranked): Virus
- Realm: Riboviria
- Kingdom: Orthornavirae
- Phylum: Negarnaviricota
- Class: Monjiviricetes
- Order: Mononegavirales
- Family: Paramyxoviridae
- Genus: Henipavirus
- Species: Henipavirus cedarense

Species of virus

Cedar virus (Henipavirus cedarense) is a henipavirus known to be harboured by Pteropus spp. Infectious virus was isolated from the urine of a mixed Pteropus alecto and Pteropus poliocephalus in Queensland, Australia in 2009. Unlike the Nipah and Hendra virus, Cedar virus infection does not lead to obvious disease in vivo. Infected animals mounted effective immune responses and seroconverted in challenge studies.

Unlike Hendra and Nipah, which attach to Ephrin B2 or B3, Cedar virus can also attach to Ephrin B1. This may be responsible for lack of observed pathogenicity or development of severe meningoencephalitis and spinal inflammation. However the atypical course of disease observed in Cedar virus infection, as opposed to the characteristic immunopathology among the prototypic Nipah-Hendra complex, may be related to Cedar virus' reduced ability to access the key immunomodulatory gene products, V, W, and C, embedded in the henipavirus phosphoprotein P.
