= Mount Langya (Anhui) =

Mountain in Anhui, China

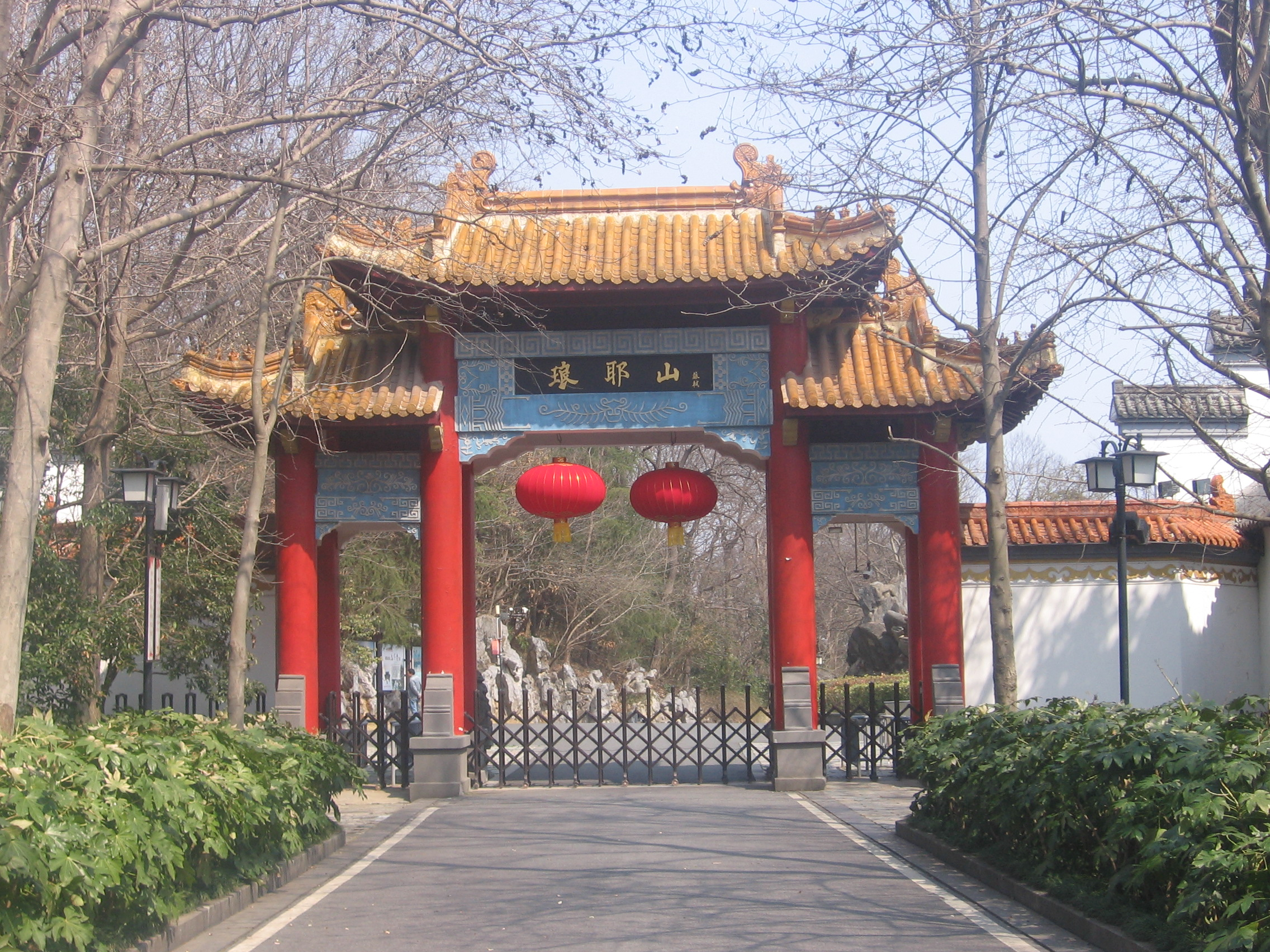

Highest point
- Elevation: 1,138 m (3,734 ft)
- Coordinates: 32°16′49″N 118°16′14″E

Geography
- Location within China
- Location: Chuzhou City, Anhui Province, People's Republic of China

Mount Langya (Chinese: 琅琊山; pinyin: Lángyá shān) is a mountain located south west of Chuzhou City, Anhui Province, People's Republic of China. A National Forest Park, National Scenic Area and 5A Tourism Attraction, the mountain is one of Anhui's five biggest scenic attractions. Along with mountain scenery, rivers and forest, the area also contains the Zuiweng Pavilion, named after the Northern Song dynasty poet Ouyang Xiu (1007–1072 CE)).

During the early Eastern Jin dynasty (317–420 CE), Emperor Yuan of Jin, gave the area to King Langya (琅琊王), from which it takes its name.

== Attractions ==
The primary attractions in the area are:

- Gumei Pavilion (古梅亭)
- Zuiweng Pavilion
- Rang Spring (让泉)
- Xixin Pavilion (洗心亭)
- Langya Old Road (琅琊古道)
- Lake Shenxiu (深秀湖)
- Langya Temple (琅琊寺),
- Nantianmen (南天门)
- Huifeng Pavilion (会峰阁)
- Tongle Garden (同乐园)
- Fengle Pavilion (丰乐亭)

== See also ==
- Mount Langya (Hebei)
- Langya henipavirus
