= VicRail =

VicRail or Vic Rail may refer to:

- Vic Rail (horse trainer), Australian horse trainer who died of the effects of Hendra virus
- Victorian Railways, operator of most rail transport in the Australian state of Victoria 1859–1983
