= Langya virus =

- Structure of a paramyxovirus such as LayV

Virus classification
- (unranked): Virus
- Realm: Riboviria
- Kingdom: Orthornavirae
- Phylum: Negarnaviricota
- Class: Monjiviricetes
- Order: Mononegavirales
- Family: Paramyxoviridae
- Genus: Parahenipavirus
- Species: Parahenipavirus langyaense

Synonyms
- Langya henipavirus

Species of virus

Langya virus (LayV), scientific name Parahenipavirus langyaense, is a species of paramyxovirus first detected in the Chinese provinces of Shandong and Henan. It has been announced in 35 patients from 2018 to August 2022. All but 9 of the 35 cases in China were infected with LayV only, with the symptoms including fever, fatigue, and cough. No deaths due to LayV have been reported as of August 2022. Langya virus affects species including humans, dogs, goats, and its presumed original host, shrews. The 35 cases were not in contact with each other, and it is not known as of August 2022 if the virus is capable of human-to-human transmission.

== Etymology ==
The name of the virus in Simplified Chinese (琅琊病毒, Lángyá bìngdú) refers to Langya Commandery, a historical commandery in present-day Shandong, China.

== Classification ==
Langya virus is classified in the family Paramyxoviridae. It is also closely related to the Nipah virus and the Hendra virus.

== Symptoms ==
Of the 35 people infected with the virus, 26 were identified as not showing signs of another infection. They all experienced fever, with fatigue being the second most common symptom. Coughing, muscle pains, nausea, headaches and vomiting were also reported as symptoms of infection.

More than half of the infectees had leukopenia, and more than a third had thrombocytopenia, with a smaller number being reported to have impaired liver or kidney function.

== Transmission ==
The researchers who identified the virus found LayV antibodies in a few goats and dogs, and identified LayV viral RNA in 27% of the 262 shrews they sampled. They found no strong evidence of the virus spreading between people. One researcher commented in the NEJM that henipaviruses do not typically spread between people, and thus LayV would be unlikely to become a pandemic, stating: "The only henipavirus that has showed some sign of human-to-human transmission is the Nipah virus and that requires very close contact. I don't think this has much pandemic potential." Another researcher noted that LayV is most likely not transmitted from person to person easily, and that the most likely source of a future pandemic would be a virus that "jumps" from animals to humans.

== Control measures ==
The Taiwan Centers for Disease Control said in August 2022 that they would establish a nucleic acid testing method to identify the virus and strengthen surveillance after reports of an outbreak in China.
