= Zuiweng =

Zuiweng may refer to:

- Runje Shaw (1896–1975), also known as Shao Zuiweng (Chinese: 邵醉翁), Chinese film entrepreneur
- Ouyang Xiu (1007–1072), art name Zuiweng (Chinese: 醉翁), Song dynasty writer and politician

- Zuiweng Pavilion, pavilion in Chuzhou city, Anhui, China, named for Ouyang Xiu's art name
