= Jeilongvirus =

Virus classification
- (unranked): Virus
- Realm: Riboviria
- Kingdom: Orthornavirae
- Phylum: Negarnaviricota
- Class: Monjiviricetes
- Order: Mononegavirales
- Family: Paramyxoviridae
- Subfamily: Orthoparamyxovirinae
- Genus: Jeilongvirus

Genus of viruses

Jeilongvirus is a genus of viruses in the family Paramyxoviridae.

== Species ==
The genus contains the following species:

- Jeilongvirus apodemi
- Jeilongvirus beilongi
- Jeilongvirus chaetodipodis
- Jeilongvirus eothenomysis
- Jeilongvirus gueckedouense
- Jeilongvirus lishuiense
- Jeilongvirus longquanense
- Jeilongvirus lophuromysis
- Jeilongvirus mabuense
- Jeilongvirus mastomysis
- Jeilongvirus meliandouense
- Jeilongvirus merionis
- Jeilongvirus microti
- Jeilongvirus myodesis
- Jeilongvirus neotomae
- Jeilongvirus ninovense
- Jeilongvirus niviventris
- Jeilongvirus nzerekorense
- Jeilongvirus ochotonae
- Jeilongvirus oujiangense
- Jeilongvirus pajuense
- Jeilongvirus praomysis
- Jeilongvirus queenslandense
- Jeilongvirus ratti
- Jeilongvirus rungweense
- Jeilongvirus sichuanense
- Jeilongvirus taichungense
- Jeilongvirus tailamense
- Jeilongvirus typhlomysis
- Jeilongvirus winnikense
- Jeilongvirus wufengense
- Jeilongvirus yeoncheonense
