= Aquaparamyxovirus =

Virus classification
- (unranked): Virus
- Realm: Riboviria
- Kingdom: Orthornavirae
- Phylum: Negarnaviricota
- Class: Monjiviricetes
- Order: Mononegavirales
- Family: Paramyxoviridae
- Subfamily: Feraresvirinae
- Genus: Aquaparamyxovirus

Species
- See text

Genus of viruses

Aquaparamyxovirus is a genus of viruses in the family Paramyxoviridae, order Mononegavirales. The genus includes two species. Fish serve as the natural hosts for AsaPV, in which the virus may cause proliferative gill inflammation.

== Taxonomy ==
The genus contains the following species:

- Aquaparamyxovirus oregonense
- Aquaparamyxovirus salmonis

== Structure ==
Viruses of the genus Aquaparamyxovirus produce virions that are enveloped, with spherical geometries. The diameter is around 150 nm. Genomes are linear, around 17 kb in length. The genome codes for 9 proteins.

Genus	Structure	Symmetry	Capsid	Genomic arrangement	Genomic segmentation
Aquaparamyxovirus	Spherical		Enveloped	Linear	Monopartite

== Life cycle ==
Viral replication is cytoplasmic. Entry into the host cell is achieved by attachment to host cell surface receptors through HN glycoprotein. Fusion with the plasma membrane; ribonucleocapsid is released in the cytoplasm. Sequential transcription, viral mRNAs are capped and polyadenylated in the cytoplasm. Replication presumably starts when enough nucleoprotein is present to encapsidate neo-synthesized antigenomes and genomes. The ribonucleocapsid binds to the matrix protein and buds via the host ESCRT complexes occurs at the plasma membrane host receptors, which mediates endocytosis. Replication follows the negative stranded RNA virus replication model. Negative stranded RNA virus transcription, using polymerase stuttering is the method of transcription. Translation takes place by leaky scanning. The virus exits the host cell by budding. Fish serve as the natural host.

Genus	Host details	Tissue tropism	Entry details	Release details	Replication site	Assembly site	Transmission
Aquaparamyxovirus	Fish	None	Glycoprotein	Budding	Cytoplasm	Cytoplasm	Unknown
