= Feraresvirinae =

Virus classification
- (unranked): Virus
- Realm: Riboviria
- Kingdom: Orthornavirae
- Phylum: Negarnaviricota
- Class: Monjiviricetes
- Order: Mononegavirales
- Family: Paramyxoviridae
- Subfamily: Feraresvirinae

Subfamily of viruses

Feraresvirinae is a subfamily of viruses in the family Paramyxoviridae.

== Taxonomy ==
The subfamily contains three genera, and they are the following:

- Aquaparamyxovirus
- Ferlavirus
- Respirovirus
