= Ghanaian bat henipavirus =

Virus classification
- (unranked): Virus
- Realm: Riboviria
- Kingdom: Orthornavirae
- Phylum: Negarnaviricota
- Class: Monjiviricetes
- Order: Mononegavirales
- Family: Paramyxoviridae
- Genus: Henipavirus
- Species: Henipavirus ghanaense

Synonyms
- Kumasi virus

Species of Henipavirus

Ghanaian bat henipavirus (GhV), also known Kumasi virus (KV), belongs to the genus Henipavirus in the family Paramyxoviridae. Human infections are caused by zoonotic events where the virus crosses over from another animal species. Therefore, humans are not the innate host for this virus family but instead become infected by peripheral viral reservoirs such as bats and other carriers of the virus. When these virus are spread to humans through zoonotic events they have been found to be one of the most deadly viruses with the capability to infect humans, with mortality rates between 50 and 100%. Therefore, these viruses have been classified as a biosafety level four (BSL-4) virus with regards to its pathogenesis when it infects humans.

Compared to other henipaviruses, KV exhibits reduced surface expression of the attachment glycoprotein (KV-G). It is likely that KV-G expression is delayed in the endoplasmic reticulum and is not exported as readily to the cell surface due to defects in higher-order oligomerization. This may lead to reduced pathogenicity.

== Emergence ==
Emergence of Henipavirus was seen in 1994 when an outbreak in Australia caused an infectious outbreak in horses leading to severe respiratory disease. During this outbreak two people were infected and one died. Henipavirus emergence is still relatively recent leading to a need for a greater range of genomic studies. Upon emergence in Australia it was found that Australian mainland flying foxes (bats) were the primary reservoir for the virus through analysis of their uterine fluid and urine. However, it was discovered through subsequent break outs of Henipavirus that humans do not seem to contract the disease directly from flying foxes. In all human cases (4 of which have been fatal) the primary vector of transmission was infected horses. Therefore, it seems that horses contract the disease from flying foxes while humans contract the virus through close proximity to infected horses. This has also been further supported by a decrease in human contraction of Henipavirus after the development of an equestrian vaccine for the virus. Epidemiological data show the presence of these viruses in Asia, Africa, and the South Pacific. In several studies it has been shown that bats, livestock, and humans carry neutralizing antibodies for Henipavirus in the Ghanaian region showing the potential for the existence of the virus within this population.

GhV was first detected in a zoological garden in Kumasi, Ghana in February 2008. Guano samples from a colony of an estimated 400,000 bats of the species Eidolon helvum were collected and screened for viral RNA. While 3 RNA genomes were obtained: BatPV/Eid.hel/GH10/2008; BatPV; Eid.hel/GH45/2008; and BatPV/Eid.hel/GH48/2008, only isolate BatPV/Eid.hel/GH10/2008 contained enough RNA to reliably quantified. BatPV/Eid.hel/GH10/2008 showed the highest sequence parsimony to established Nipah and Hendra henipavirus genomes. Infectious particles could not be isolated in cell culture; no cytopathic effects were observed and no viral RNA could be obtained.

KV would be the first known henipavirus detected outside of the Austroasiatic geographic province that other known henipaviruses are known to circulate. Serological evidence has previously suggested that henipaviruses likely have a much wider geographic range beyond areas of endemic Nipah and Hendra infection, namely that undetected henipavirus infections may be common in South America and continental Africa.

== Genome ==
Henipavirus contain an enveloped single-strand negative-sense RNA genome. Therefore, they belong to the same genomic group of viruses such as measles and mumps which are more commonly found to cause pathogenesis and infection in humans; Measles, mumps, and other related viral pathogens also belong to the viral family Paramyxoviridae. There are two pathogenic members of the Henipavirus genome, Nipah Virus (NiV) and Hendra Virus (HeV). Ghanaian Bat Henipavirus (GhV) is phylogenetically related to both NiV and HeV although it is most closely associated with NiV. Both NiV and HeV consists of an 18.2kb genome encoding for six structural proteins; nucleoprotein (N), phosphoprotein (P), matrix protein (M), fusion protein (F), attachment glycoprotein (G), and the large protein or RNA polymerase protein (L). Furthermore, three nonstructural proteins are encoded by the P gene; Two RNA editing proteins (W and V) and on alternative open reading frame protein (C). These genomes are conserved in most phylogenetic members of the Henipavirus genus. While members of the Henipavirus genus are similar in structure and protein makeup they do have subtle genomic differentiation in their nucleic acid sequences. While subtle differences exist both HeV and NiV are replicable in a variety of host species such as its natural reservoir bats, several forms of livestock, and of course humans. However, the zoonotic potential for GhV is unknown as there have been no cases of transmission in Africa from the bat reservoir to any other organism.

== GhV entry ==
Similar to all Henipavirus's GhV expresses two surface glycoproteins; The fusion protein (F) and the attachment glycoprotein (G). Both of these proteins mediate the entry process of GhV. Like other Henipavirus's the GhV glycoprotein G binds to the cellular surface receptor ephrin-B2. Ephrin-B2 is a transmembrane cellular surface receptor tyrosine kinase responsible for bi-directional signaling during tumorigenesis and other developmental events. Furthermore, this family of receptors has been shown to be highly conserved amongst humans and other animals explaining the broad Henipavirus transmission amongst several different species. Like most enveloped viruses GhV follows the process of viral entry into the cell through two specific processes; Receptor binding and membrane fusion.

Attachment glycoprotein G is a tetrameric transmembrane domain protein that has a short cytoplasmic N-terminal tail and a large C-terminal globular head. This structure links the transmembrane and extracellular regions of this protein allowing it to bind to the Ephrin-B2 receptor on the cells surface. Furthermore, this creates a distinction between GhV and other Henipavirus's compared to other members of the Paramyxoviridae family as they do not exhibit hemagglutinate or neuraminidase activity and therefore do not bind sialic acid, only cell surface protein receptors.

The Fusion protein F is synthesized as an inactive precursor F0 form before being cleaved by cellular proteases into the active form upon attachment by the G protein to the ephrin receptor. All domains of the fusion protein are conserved by NiV, HeV, and GhV as the protein contains a fusion cleavage sequence, fusion peptide, and the transmembrane anchor domain.

The least understood element of the entry of GhV into the cell is the association between the attachment protein G and the fusion protein F. Therefore, two models have been established for the entry of this virus: The "clamp" model and the "provocateur" model. In the "clamp" model the F protein is activated by the removal of an inhibitor upon clamping of the attachment protein to the cell surface receptor. The "provocateur" model highlights a positive conformational change of the F protein upon the attachment of protein G to the cells surface receptor. In either case the F protein is somehow activated by the attachment of the G protein to the cells surface receptor causing a release of the fusion peptide allowing the virus to be brought into the cell through endocytosis.

While this process is highly efficient in HeV and NiV leading to a broad tropism and effective infection of the virus within the host GhV exhibits a less than effective entry process. While HeV and NiV have strong fusion activity with a variety of host cells, GhV is restricted to a limited host range and only replicates in certain bat cells. This has been shown to be a result of an insufficient expression of GhV attachment protein G on the virus's surface. With less attachment protein present the efficiency of cell-cell viral-mediated fusion would be less than optimal for viral transmission. Furthermore, lower expression of the G protein would limit its interaction with fusion protein F limiting the virus's capabilities of fusing with the host cell membrane reducing its capability for cellular entry via receptor-mediated endocytosis. In addition, a slight change in the cytoplasmic domain showed a limiting in the G proteins capabilities of activating the fusion protein F upon attachment to host cellular membrane receptor ephrin-B2. Therefore, GhV is and has been limited to its innate reservoir of bat species limiting its zoonotic potential to infect other animals and humans.

Figure 1. Structure of Henipavirus shows the attachment protein (G) and the Fusion protein (F) located on the viral capsid. Furthermore, replication proteins N, L, and P are shown associated with the viral RNA.

== GhV replication ==
Upon virus entry into the cell, RNA replication can occur. As a negative-strand RNA virus, GhV brings its own RNA-dependent RNA-polymerase with it into the cell. Three proteins are essential for GhV replication: The nucleocapsid protein (N), the phosphoprotein (P), and the RNA-dependent RNA polymerase (RdRp) (L). It has been shown that GhV and other Henipavirus's RdRp's have a two-fold function, RNA transcription to mRNA and RNA replication of the genome. The transcriptase complex is composed of L and P proteins and is responsible for the conversion of the negative-sense RNA genome into mRNA to be translated into viral proteins. As a replicase, the protein complex is responsible for the creation of genomic and anti-genomic RNA with its subsequent encapsulation in N proteins. The level of N proteins is a limiting component in the change from transcriptase to replicase; With more N protein there is greater replicase activity. Furthermore, replication can occur in a variety of cell lines and types as the ephrin-B2 receptor is highly conserved amongst cell types. Therefore, replication is limited to cells expressing the ephrin-B2 receptor. This has been found in respiratory endothelial cells for HeV and NiV where pathogenesis is the greatest. However, this has not been discovered for GhV.

== Henipavirus symptoms and pathogenesis ==
Infection with a Henipavirus, such as the more pathogenic HeV and NiV, can lead to vasculitis, necrosis, thrombosis, as well as brain parenchyma lesion associated with the formation of giant multi-nucleated cells. Furthermore, with effects to vascular tissues Henipavirus causes severe respiratory pathogenesis. Infection of vascular endothelial cells leads to cellular disfunction and apoptosis causing large amounts of vascular inflammation. While pathogenesis is severe in HeV and NiV, GhV has not been shown to cause these symptoms in other animals due to less of an ability to replicate in other hosts outside of the natural bat reservoir.
