= Parajeilongvirus =

Virus classification
- (unranked): Virus
- Realm: Riboviria
- Kingdom: Orthornavirae
- Phylum: Negarnaviricota
- Class: Monjiviricetes
- Order: Mononegavirales
- Family: Paramyxoviridae
- Subfamily: Orthoparamyxovirinae
- Genus: Parajeilongvirus

Genus of viruses

Parajeilongvirus is a genus of viruses in the family Paramyxoviridae.

== Species ==
The genus contains the following species:

- Parajeilongvirus brazilense
- Parajeilongvirus carolliae
- Parajeilongvirus comorosense
- Parajeilongvirus desmodi
- Parajeilongvirus diaemi
- Parajeilongvirus erinacei
- Parajeilongvirus hainanense
- Parajeilongvirus hipposideri
- Parajeilongvirus hubeiense
- Parajeilongvirus jingmenense
- Parajeilongvirus madagascarense
- Parajeilongvirus miniopteri
- Parajeilongvirus myotis
- Parajeilongvirus pipistrelli
- Parajeilongvirus plecoti
- Parajeilongvirus rhinolophi
- Parajeilongvirus wenzhouense
- Parajeilongvirus zhejiangense
