= Baby hamster kidney cell =

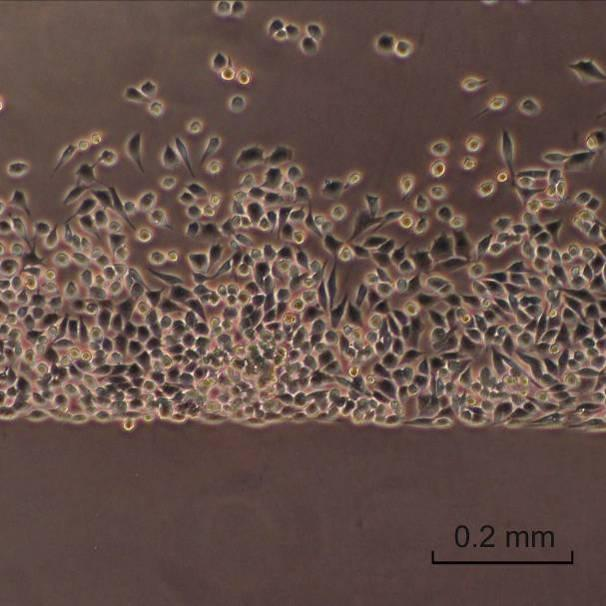
BHK21 cells cultured on flexible interfacial area of PFC / culture medium system

Baby Hamster Kidney fibroblasts (BHK cells) are an adherent cell line used in molecular biology. The cells were derived in 1961 by I. A. Macpherson and M. G. P. Stoker. Nowadays, subclone 13 is occasionally used, which was originally derived by single-cell isolation from the kidneys of five unsexed, 1-day-old hamsters.

== BHK and virus infection ==
BHK-21 cells are susceptible to human adenovirus D, reovirus 3, and vesicular stomatitis virus (Indiana strain). BHK-21 cells are resistant to poliovirus 2 and Rabbit vesivirus (RaV). The cells are negative for reverse transcriptase, which means that they lack integral retrovirus genomes.

== Utilization ==
The BHK-21 cells are useful for transformations and for stable and temporary transfections. BHK cells are also used to study viral infections.

== Recommended growth medium ==
- High-glucose DMEM
- FBS fetal bovine serum: 5% (15% when freeze)
- GLU glutamine: 1%
- PSA regular antibiotics: 1%
- Splitting: 10 by trypsin
