= Ferlavirus =

Virus classification
- (unranked): Virus
- Realm: Riboviria
- Kingdom: Orthornavirae
- Phylum: Negarnaviricota
- Class: Monjiviricetes
- Order: Mononegavirales
- Family: Paramyxoviridae
- Subfamily: Feraresvirinae
- Genus: Ferlavirus
- Species: Ferlavirus reptilis

Synonyms
- Reptilian ferlavirus; Fer-de-Lance paramyxovirus

Genus of viruses

Ferlavirus, also referred to as Ophidian paramyxovirus, is a genus of viruses in the family Paramyxoviridae, order Mononegavirales. Reptiles serve as natural hosts. There is currently only one species in this genus (Ferlavirus reptilis) to accommodate a single virus, Fer-de-Lance virus (FDLV).

== Structure ==
Ferlaviruses produce virions that are enveloped, with spherical geometries. The virion diameter is around 150 nm. Ferlavirus genome is linear and around 15 kb in length. The genome codes for 8 proteins.

Genus	Structure	Symmetry	Capsid	Genomic arrangement	Genomic segmentation
Ferlavirus	Spherical		Enveloped	Linear	Monopartite

== Life cycle ==
Viral replication is cytoplasmic. Entry into the host cell is achieved by virus attaches to host cell. Replication follows the negative stranded RNA virus replication model. Negative stranded RNA virus transcription, using polymerase stuttering is the method of transcription. The virus exits the host cell by budding. Reptiles serve as the natural host.

Genus	Host details	Tissue tropism	Entry details	Release details	Replication site	Assembly site	Transmission
Ferlavirus	Unknown	None	Glycoprotein	Budding	Cytoplasm	Cytoplasm	Unknown
