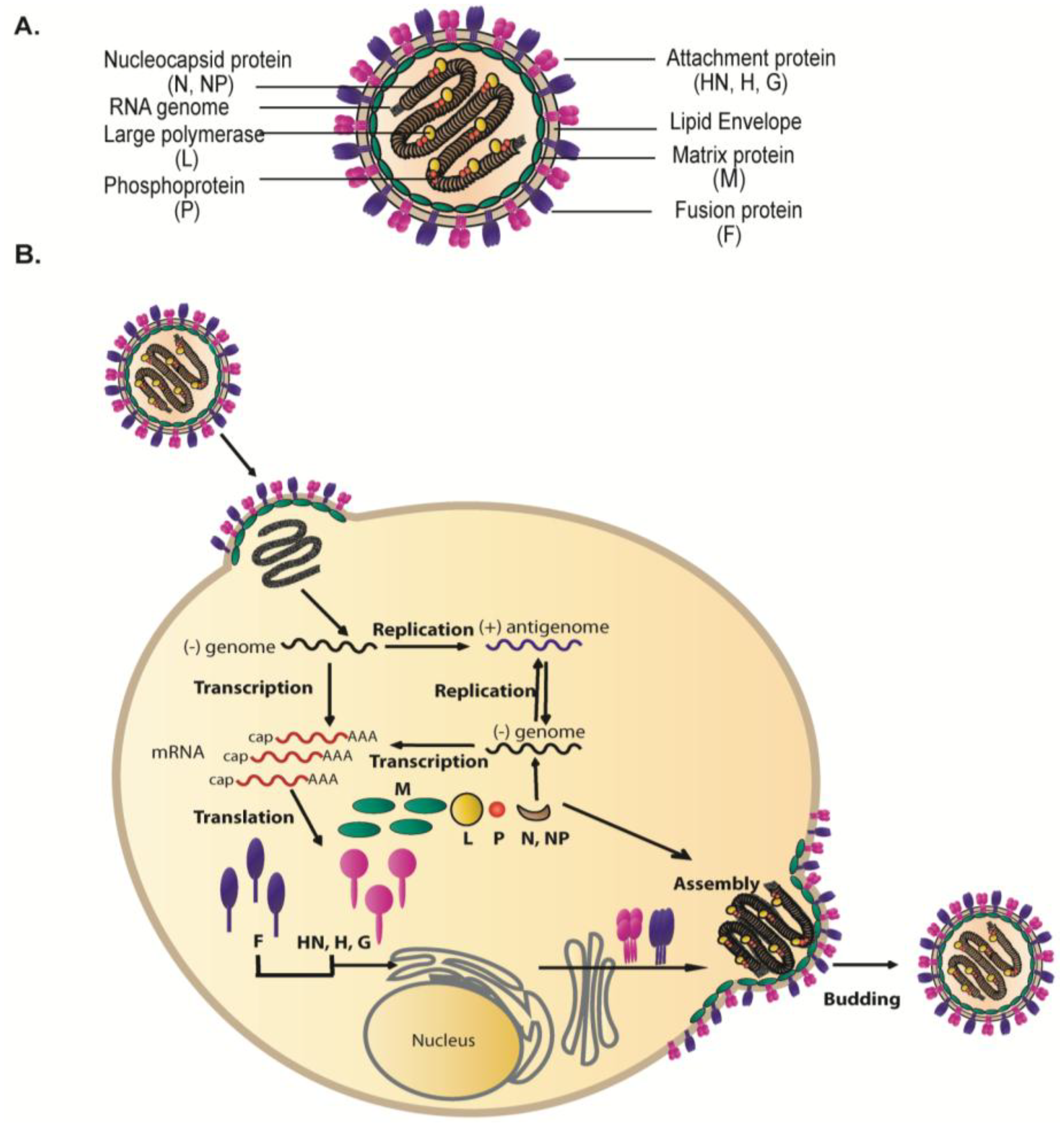
- Paramyxovirus life cycle diagram

Virus classification
- (unranked): Virus
- Realm: Riboviria
- Kingdom: Orthornavirae
- Phylum: Negarnaviricota
- Class: Monjiviricetes
- Order: Mononegavirales
- Family: Paramyxoviridae
- Subfamily: Orthoparamyxovirinae

= Orthoparamyxovirinae =

Subfamily of viruses

Orthoparamyxovirinae is a subfamily of viruses in the family Paramyxoviridae.

== Taxonomy ==
The subfamily contains the following genera:

- Bovinavirus
- Henipavirus
- Jeilongvirus
- Morbillivirus
- Narmovirus
- Parahenipavirus
- Parajeilongvirus
- Paramorbillivirus
- Salemvirus
- Tupaivirus
