= Narmovirus =

Virus classification
- (unranked): Virus
- Realm: Riboviria
- Kingdom: Orthornavirae
- Phylum: Negarnaviricota
- Class: Monjiviricetes
- Order: Mononegavirales
- Family: Paramyxoviridae
- Subfamily: Orthoparamyxovirinae
- Genus: Narmovirus

Genus of viruses

Narmovirus is a genus of viruses in the family Paramyxoviridae.

== Species ==
The genus contains the following species:

- Narmovirus meliandouense
- Narmovirus microti
- Narmovirus mossmanense
- Narmovirus myodesis
- Narmovirus narivaense
- Narmovirus ninovense
