= EPH receptor A3 =

Protein-coding gene in the species Homo sapiens

EPHA3
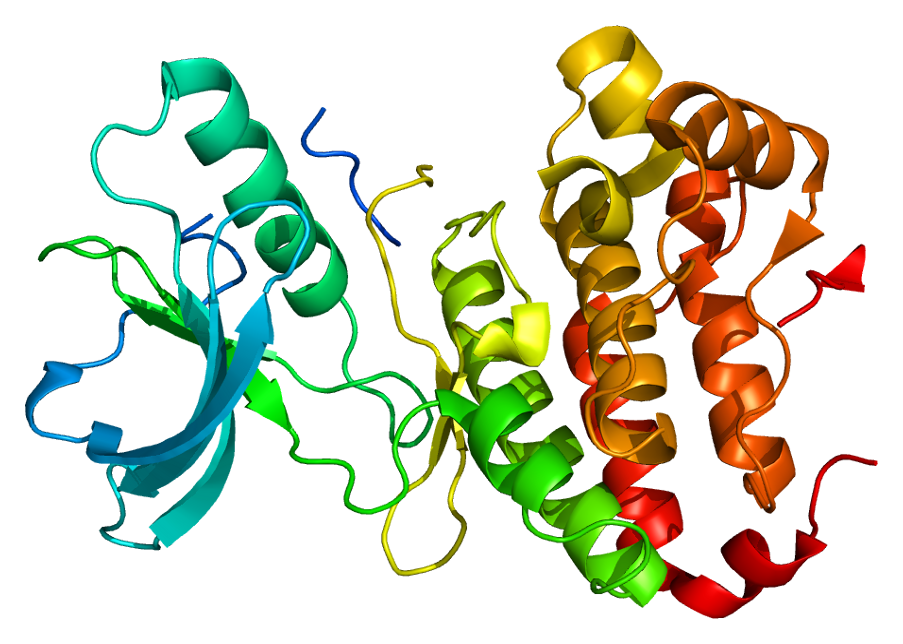

Identifiers
- Aliases: EPHA3, Epha3, AW492086, Cek4, ETK1, End3, Hek, Hek4, Mek4, Tyro4, EK4, ETK, EPH receptor A3, HEK, HEK4, TYRO4
- External IDs: OMIM: 179611; MGI: 99612; GeneCards: EPHA3
Available structures
PDB	Ortholog search: PDBe RCSB
PDB	List of PDB id codes 2GSF, 2QO7, 2QO9, 2QOB, 2QOC, 2QOD, 2QOF, 2QOI, 2QOK, 2QOL, 2QON, 2QOO, 2QOQ, 3DZQ, 3FXX, 3FY2, 4G2F, 4GK2, 4GK3, 4GK4, 4L0P, 4P4C, 4P5Q, 4P5Z, 4TWN, 4TWO
Enzyme activity
EC #	BRENDA	ExPASy	KEGG	MetaCyc
2.7.10.1	↗	↗	↗	↗

Gene location (Human)
Chr.	Chromosome 3 (human)
Band	3p11.1	Start	89,107,621 bp
Band	3p11.1	End	89,482,134 bp

Gene location (Mouse)
Chr.	Chromosome 16 (mouse)
Band	16|16 C1.3	Start	63,363,897 bp
Band	16|16 C1.3	End	63,684,538 bp
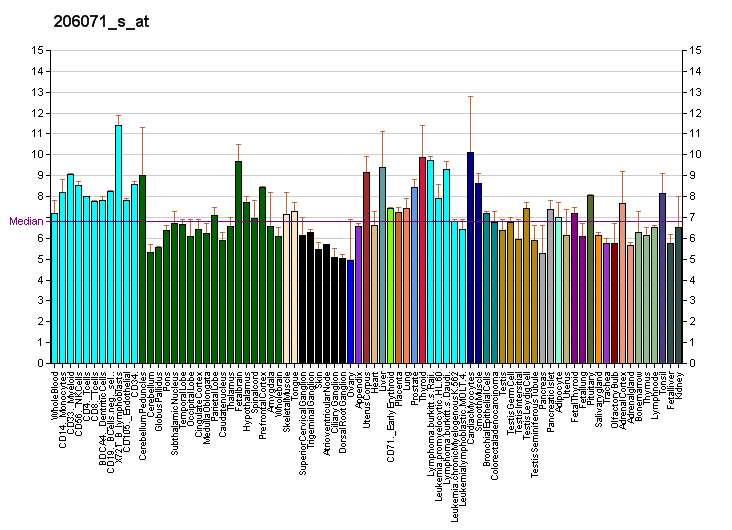

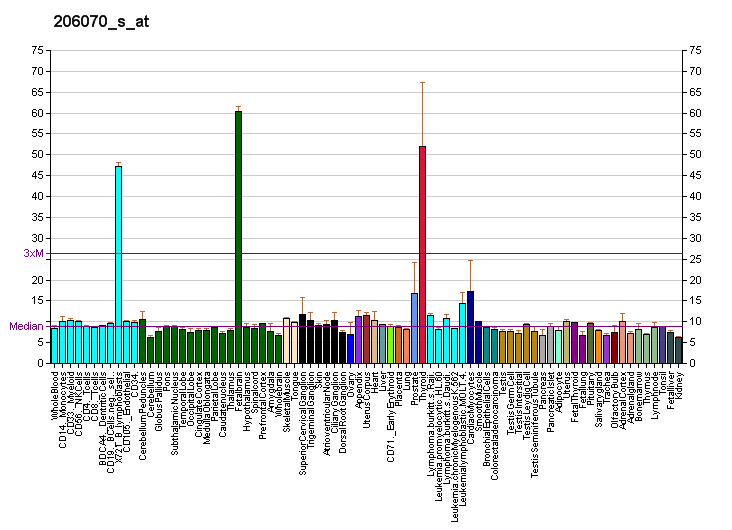

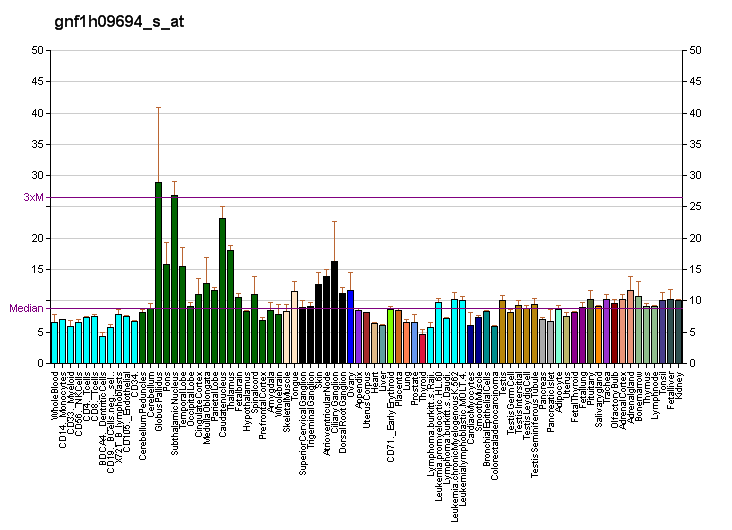
RNA expression pattern
Bgee	Human / Mouse (ortholog); Top expressed in: ganglionic eminence; buccal mucosa cell; urethra; gallbladder; mucosa of urinary bladder; tibia; Achilles tendon; prostate; right coronary artery; placenta / Top expressed in: maxillary part of mouth; upper jaw; ganglionic eminence; tongue; calvaria; medial ganglionic eminence; human fetus; left lung lobe; efferent ductule; abdominal wall; More reference expression data
BioGPS	More reference expression data
Gene ontology
Molecular function	transferase activity; nucleotide binding; protein kinase activity; GPI-linked ephrin receptor activity; kinase activity; protein binding; transmembrane receptor protein tyrosine kinase activity; protein tyrosine kinase activity; ATP binding; ephrin receptor activity; receptor tyrosine kinase; transmembrane signaling receptor activity; transmembrane-ephrin receptor activity
Cellular component	integral component of membrane; membrane; plasma membrane; integral component of plasma membrane; extracellular region; early endosome; cytoplasm; neuron projection; receptor complex
Biological process	cellular response to retinoic acid; regulation of actin cytoskeleton organization; fasciculation of motor neuron axon; phosphorylation; transmembrane receptor protein tyrosine kinase signaling pathway; regulation of GTPase activity; regulation of epithelial to mesenchymal transition; regulation of microtubule cytoskeleton organization; protein phosphorylation; cell adhesion; positive regulation of neuron projection development; regulation of focal adhesion assembly; fasciculation of sensory neuron axon; cell migration; ephrin receptor signaling pathway; peptidyl-tyrosine phosphorylation; negative regulation of endocytosis; positive regulation of protein localization to plasma membrane; negative regulation of signal transduction; cell differentiation; negative regulation of apoptotic process; positive regulation of ERK1 and ERK2 cascade; axon guidance
Sources:Amigo / QuickGO
Orthologs
Databases	NCBI: entry; OMA: entry
Species	Human	Mouse
Entrez	2042	13837
Ensembl	ENSG00000044524	ENSMUSG00000052504
UniProt	P29320	P29319; Q8BRB1
RefSeq (mRNA)	NM_005233; NM_182644	NM_010140; NM_001362452
RefSeq (protein)	NP_005224; NP_872585	NP_034270; NP_001349381
Location (UCSC)	Chr 3: 89.11 – 89.48 Mb	Chr 16: 63.36 – 63.68 Mb
PubMed search
- Wikidata
View/Edit Human	View/Edit Mouse

EPH receptor A3 (ephrin type-A receptor 3) is a protein that in humans is encoded by the EPHA3 gene.

== Function ==
This gene belongs to the ephrin receptor subfamily of the protein-tyrosine kinase family. EPH and EPH-related receptors have been implicated in mediating developmental events, particularly in the nervous system. Receptors in the EPH subfamily typically have a single kinase domain and an extracellular region containing a Cys-rich domain and 2 fibronectin type III repeats. The ephrin receptors are divided into 2 groups based on the similarity of their extracellular domain sequences and their affinities for binding ephrin-A and ephrin-B ligands. This gene encodes a protein that binds ephrin-A ligands. Two alternatively spliced transcript variants have been described for this gene.

== Interactions ==
EPH receptor A3 has been shown to interact with EFNB2 and EFNA5.
