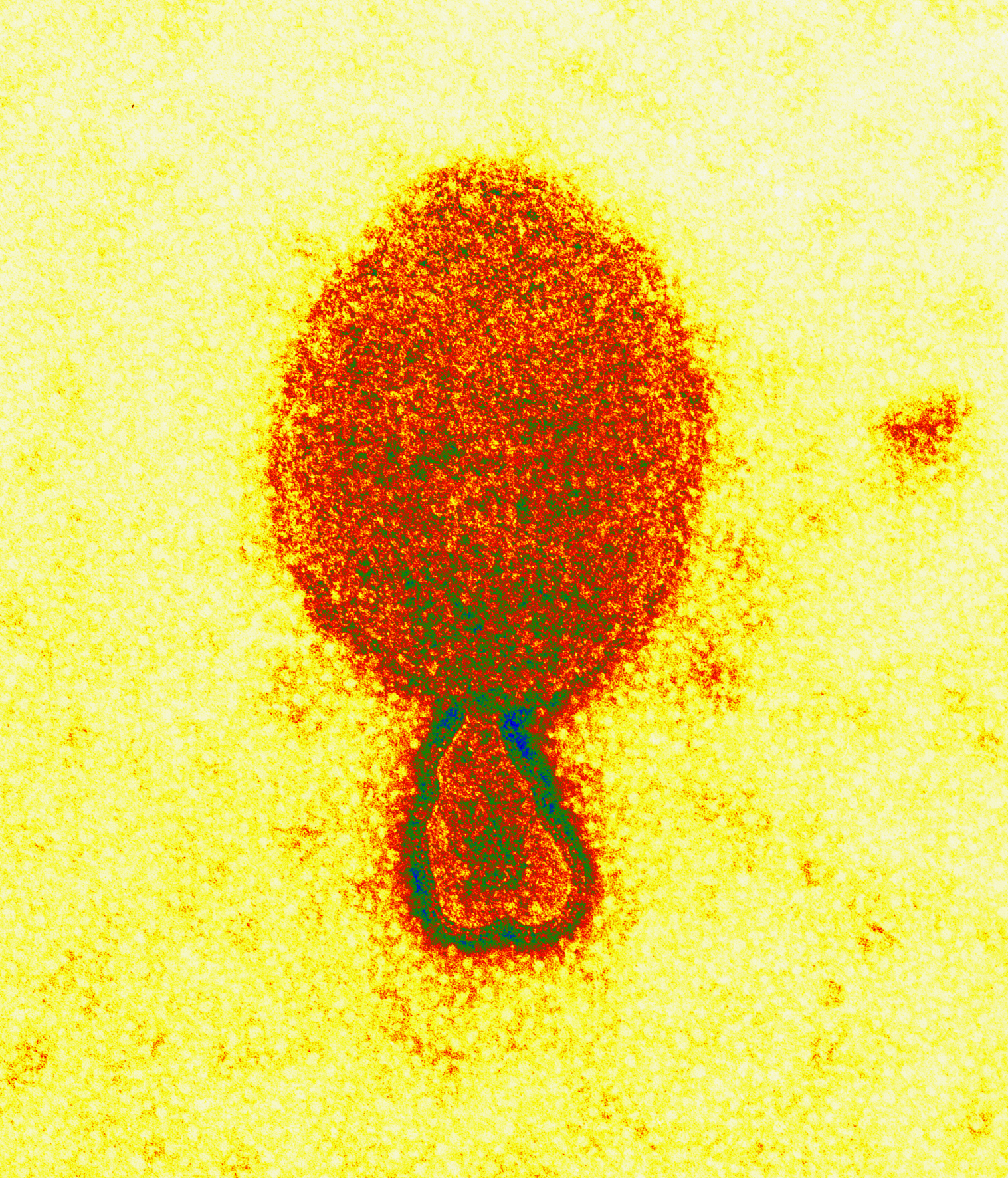
- Colored transmission electron micrograph of a Hendra virus virion (ca. 300 nm length)

Virus classification
- (unranked): Virus
- Realm: Riboviria
- Kingdom: Orthornavirae
- Phylum: Negarnaviricota
- Class: Monjiviricetes
- Order: Mononegavirales
- Family: Paramyxoviridae
- Subfamily: Orthoparamyxovirinae
- Genus: Henipavirus

Species
- See text

= Henipavirus =

Genus of RNA viruses

Henipavirus is a genus of negative-strand RNA viruses in the family Paramyxoviridae, order Mononegavirales containing five established species, and numerous others still under study. Henipaviruses are naturally harboured by several species of small mammals, notably pteropid fruit bats (flying foxes), microbats of several species, and shrews. Henipaviruses are characterised by long genomes and a wide host range. Their recent emergence as zoonotic pathogens capable of causing illness and death in domestic animals and humans is a cause of concern.

In 2009, RNA sequences of three novel viruses in phylogenetic relationship to known henipaviruses were detected in African straw-colored fruit bats (Eidolon helvum) in Ghana. The finding of these novel henipaviruses outside Australia and Asia indicates that the region of potential endemicity of henipaviruses may be worldwide. These African henipaviruses are slowly being characterised.

Nipah virus and Hendra virus are both considered category C (USDA-HHS overlap) select agents.

== Structure ==
Structure of henipaviruses

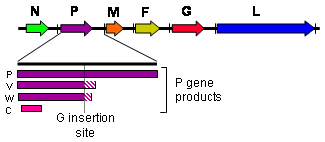
The henipavirus genome (3' to 5' orientation) and products of the P gene

Henipavirions are pleomorphic (variably shaped), ranging in size from 40 to 600 nm in diameter. They possess a lipid membrane overlying a shell of viral matrix protein. At the core is a single helical strand of genomic RNA tightly bound to N (nucleocapsid) protein and associated with the L (large) and P (phosphoprotein) proteins, which provide RNA polymerase activity during replication.

Embedded within the lipid membrane are spikes of F (fusion) protein trimers and G (attachment) protein tetramers. The function of the G protein (except in the case of MojV-G) is to attach the virus to the surface of a host cell via Ephrin B1, B2, or B3, a family of highly conserved mammalian proteins. The structure of the attachment glycoprotein has been determined by X-ray crystallography. The F protein fuses the viral membrane with the host cell membrane, releasing the virion contents into the cell. It also causes infected cells to fuse with neighbouring cells to form large, multinucleated syncytia.

== Genome ==
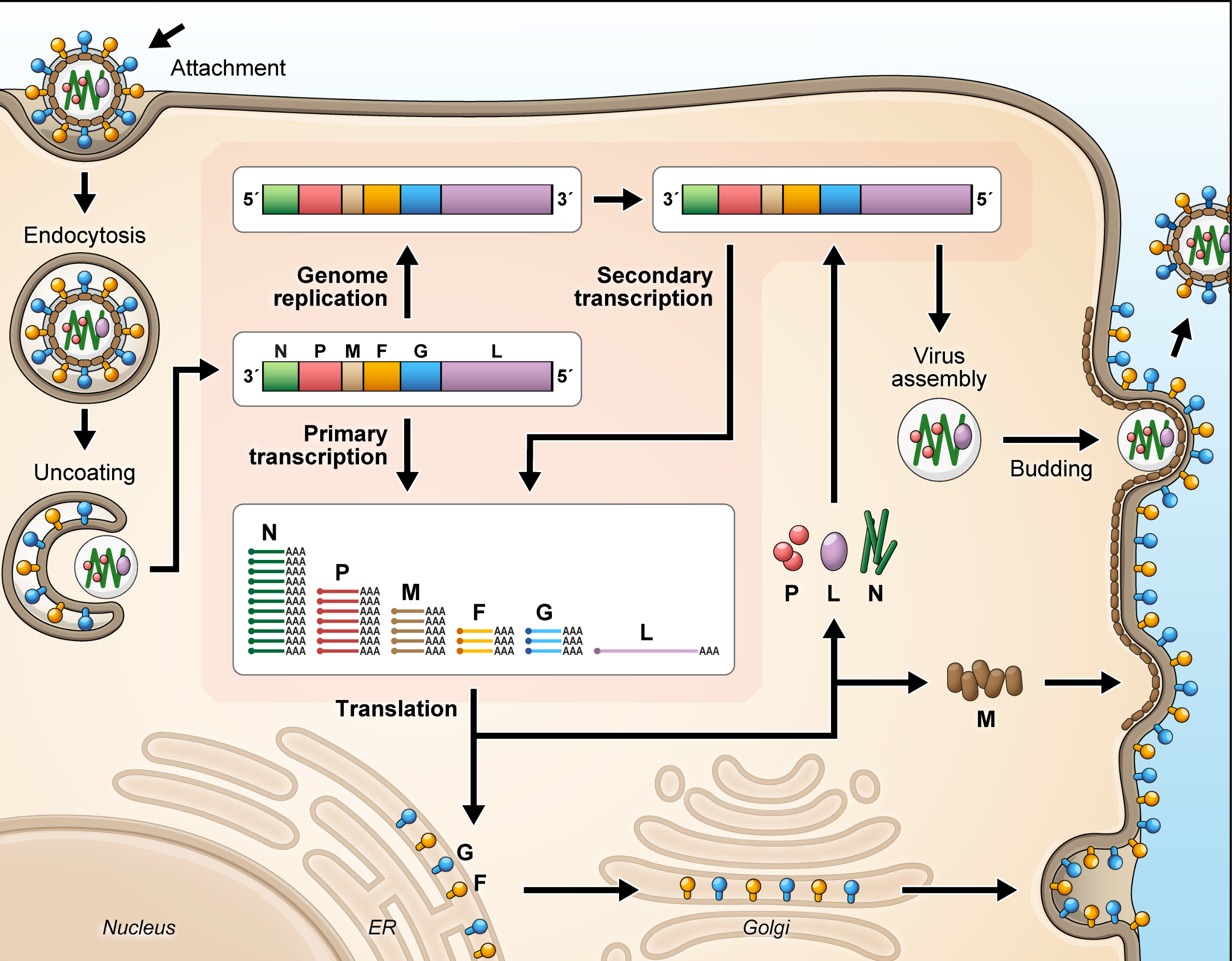
Nipah virus (NiV) replication cycle

As all mononegaviral genomes, Hendra virus and Nipah virus genomes are non-segmented, single-stranded negative-sense RNA. Both genomes are 18.2 kb in length and contain six genes corresponding to six structural proteins.

In common with other members of the Paramyxoviridae family, the number of nucleotides in the henipavirus genome is a multiple of six, consistent with what is known as the 'rule of six'. Deviation from the rule of six, through mutation or incomplete genome synthesis, leads to inefficient viral replication, probably due to structural constraints imposed by the binding between the RNA and the N protein.

Three additional protein products are produced from the henipavirus P gene: V, W, and C. The V and W proteins are generated through an unusual process called RNA editing. This specific process in henipaviruses involves the insertion of extra guanosine residues into the P gene mRNA prior to translation. The addition of a single guanosine results in production of V, and the addition of two guanosines residues produces W. The C protein is not produced through RNA editing but instead by leaky scanning of the host cell ribosome during translation of viral mRNA. P, V, and W possess an alternate open reading frame which results in production of C. P, V, W, and C are known to disrupt the host innate antiviral immune response through several different mechanisms. P, V, and W contain STAT1 binding domains, and act as interferon antagonists by sequestering STAT1 in the nucleus and cytoplasm. The C protein controls the early pro-inflammatory response and is also known to promote the viral budding process via a ESCRT-dependent pathway.

== Life cycle ==
Cell receptor ephrin-B2, which is located on epithelial cells around smaller arteries, neurons, and smooth muscle cells, is targeted by the viral protein G. Once the protein G binds to ephrin-B2, the viral protein F facilitates fusion with the host cell membrane and releases viral RNA into the host cell cytoplasm. Upon entry, transcription of viral mRNA takes place using the viral RNA as a template. This process is started and stopped by the polymerase complex. Viral proteins are gathering in the cell as transcription occurs until the polymerase complex stops transcription and starts genome replication. Transcription of the viral RNA makes positive sense strands of RNA, which are then used as templates to make more negative sense viral RNA . Genome replication is halted before the viral particles can assemble to make a virion. Once the cell membrane is ready, new virions exit the host cell through budding. Viral M protein is important in viral budding as expressing M protein orchestrates budding of virus-like particles. M protein locates in nucleus during infection cycle and its ubiquitination is needed for nuclear-cytoplasmic trafficking.

== Vaccine ==
Henipaviruses have high mortality rates in mammalian hosts, both human and animal. Because of this, there is a need for immunization against HeV and NiV. The World Health Organization has classified henipaviral agents as R&D Blueprint Priority Pathogens, indicating that they pose a significant risk due to their epidemic potential. The broad species tropism of NiV and HeV have resulted in mortality in livestock species in addition to humans, and as a result veterinary vaccines are in various stages of development or licensure. EquiVac HeV, a veterinary vaccine for horses was licensed in Australia in 2012. A number of experimental vaccines designed for humans are in preclinical development, but none have yet been licensed. A soluble HeV attachment glycoprotein vaccine designed to protect against NiV completed a phase I clinical trial in November 2022, but results have not yet been published.

The primary mechanism of protection against NiV and HeV induced by vaccination is thought to be neutralizing antibodies. However, a number of preclinical vaccine studies in animal models of disease have identified that the cell-mediated immune response including CD8+ and CD4+ T-cells may play a role in protection.

== Causes of emergence ==
The emergence of henipaviruses parallels the emergence of other zoonotic viruses in recent decades. SARS coronavirus, Australian bat lyssavirus, Menangle virus, Marburg virus, COVID 19 and possibly Ebola viruses are also harboured by bats, and are capable of infecting a variety of other species. The emergence of each of these viruses has been linked to an increase in contact between bats and humans, sometimes involving an intermediate domestic animal host. The increased contact is driven both by human encroachment into the bats' territory (in the case of Nipah, specifically pigpens in said territory) and by movement of bats towards human populations due to changes in food distribution and loss of habitat.

There is evidence that habitat loss for flying foxes, both in South Asia and Australia (particularly along the east coast) as well as encroachment of human dwellings and agriculture into the remaining habitats, is creating greater overlap of human and flying fox distributions.

== Taxonomy ==
The genus contains the following species, listed by scientific name and followed by their common names:

- Henipavirus angavokelyense, Angavokely virus
- Henipavirus cedarense, Cedar virus
- Henipavirus ghanaense, Ghanaian bat henipavirus, also called Kumasi virus
- Henipavirus hendraense, Hendra virus
- Henipavirus nipahense, Nipah virus

== See also ==
- Animal viruses
- Paramyxovirus
