= Rabbit vesivirus =

Caliciviridae virus

Rabbit vesivirus (RaV) is a Caliciviridae virus that was first isolated in the Veterinary Diagnostic Laboratory at Oregon State University, from the feces of rabbits suffering from gastrointestinal disease. The virus is a non-enveloped, isometric virus with diameter of around 30 nanometer.

Its viral genome is 8,295 nucleotides in size, consisting of positive single-stranded RNA with a small protein (VPg) covalently linked to its 5′ terminus and a 3′ poly-A tail with an average length of 85 nucleotides. The genome comprises three open reading frames, the most 5′ of which encodes a 1,880 amino acid proteolysis that yields the non-structural polypeptides upon self-cleavage. The vesivirus is the only genus of which all members are cultivable.
