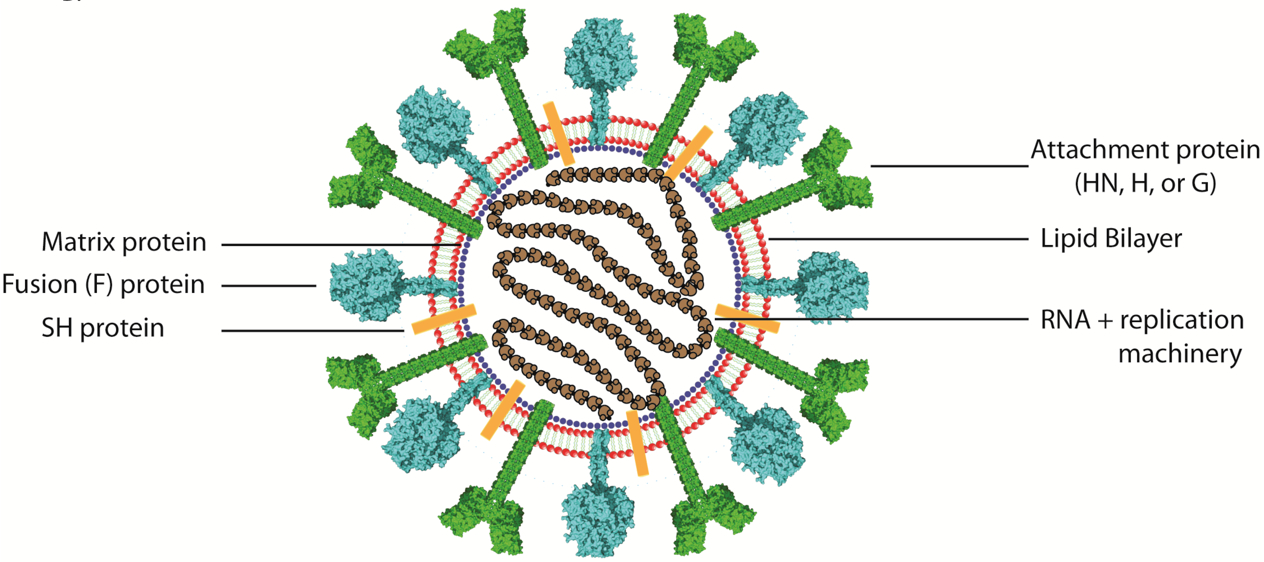
- Illustration of a respirovirus

Virus classification
- (unranked): Virus
- Realm: Riboviria
- Kingdom: Orthornavirae
- Phylum: Negarnaviricota
- Class: Monjiviricetes
- Order: Mononegavirales
- Family: Paramyxoviridae
- Subfamily: Feraresvirinae
- Genus: Respirovirus

Species
- See text

Synonyms
- Paramyxovirus

= Respirovirus =

Genus of viruses

Respirovirus is a genus of viruses in the order Mononegavirales, in the family Paramyxoviridae. Rodents and human serve as natural hosts. There are nine species in this genus. Diseases associated with this genus include: croup and other acute febrile respiratory tract infections.

== Taxonomy ==
The genus contains the following species:

- Respirovirus bovis
- Respirovirus caprae
- Respirovirus henanense
- Respirovirus laryngotracheitidis
- Respirovirus muris
- Respirovirus pneumoniae
- Respirovirus ratufae
- Respirovirus rupicaprae
- Respirovirus suis

== Structure ==
Respirovirions are enveloped, with spherical geometries. The diameter is around 150 nm. Respirovirus genomes are linear, around 15kb in length. The genome codes for 8 proteins.

Genus	Structure	Symmetry	Capsid	Genomic arrangement	Genomic segmentation
Respirovirus	Spherical		Enveloped	Linear	Monopartite

== Life cycle ==
Viral replication is cytoplasmic. Entry into the host cell is achieved by virus attaches to host cell. Replication follows the negative stranded RNA virus replication model. Negative stranded RNA virus transcription, using polymerase stuttering is the method of transcription. Translation takes place by leaky scanning, and ribosomal shunting. The virus exits the host cell by budding. Rodents and human serve as the natural host. Transmission routes are respiratory.

Genus	Host details	Tissue tropism	Entry details	Release details	Replication site	Assembly site	Transmission
Respirovirus	Rodents; humans	None	Glycoprotein	Budding	Cytoplasm	Cytoplasm	Aerosols
