= Rule of six (viruses) =

Characteristic of paramyxovirus genomes

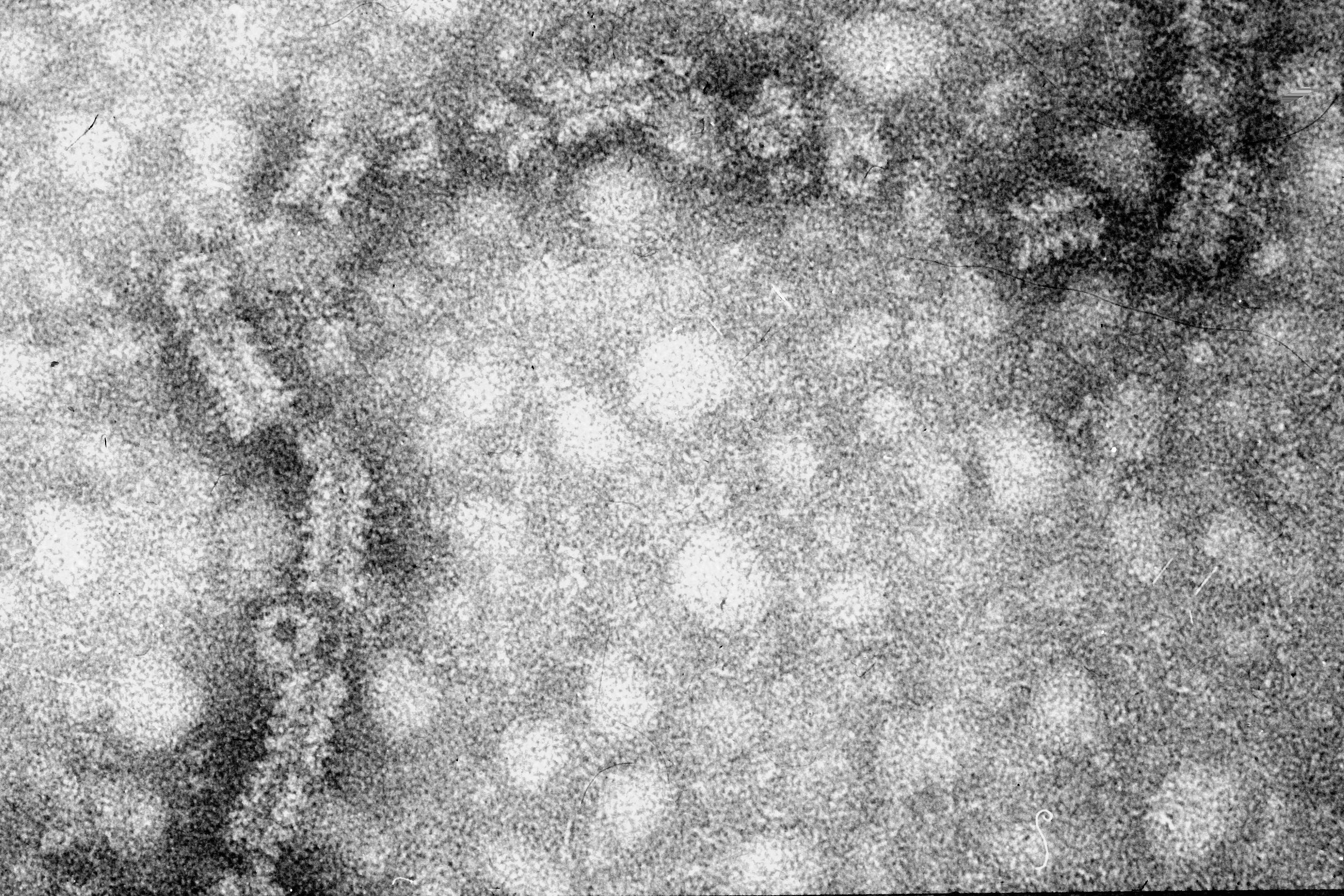
Electron micrograph of the ribonucleoprotein of mumps virus, which has a herring-bone like structure

The rule of six is a feature of paramyxovirus genomes. These RNA viruses have genes made from RNA and not DNA, and their whole genome – that is the number of nucleotides – is always a multiple of six. This is because during their replication, these viruses are dependent on nucleoprotein molecules that each bind to six nucleotides.
