= Zuiweng Pavilion =

Building in China

Coordinates: 32.28342°N 118.28814°E

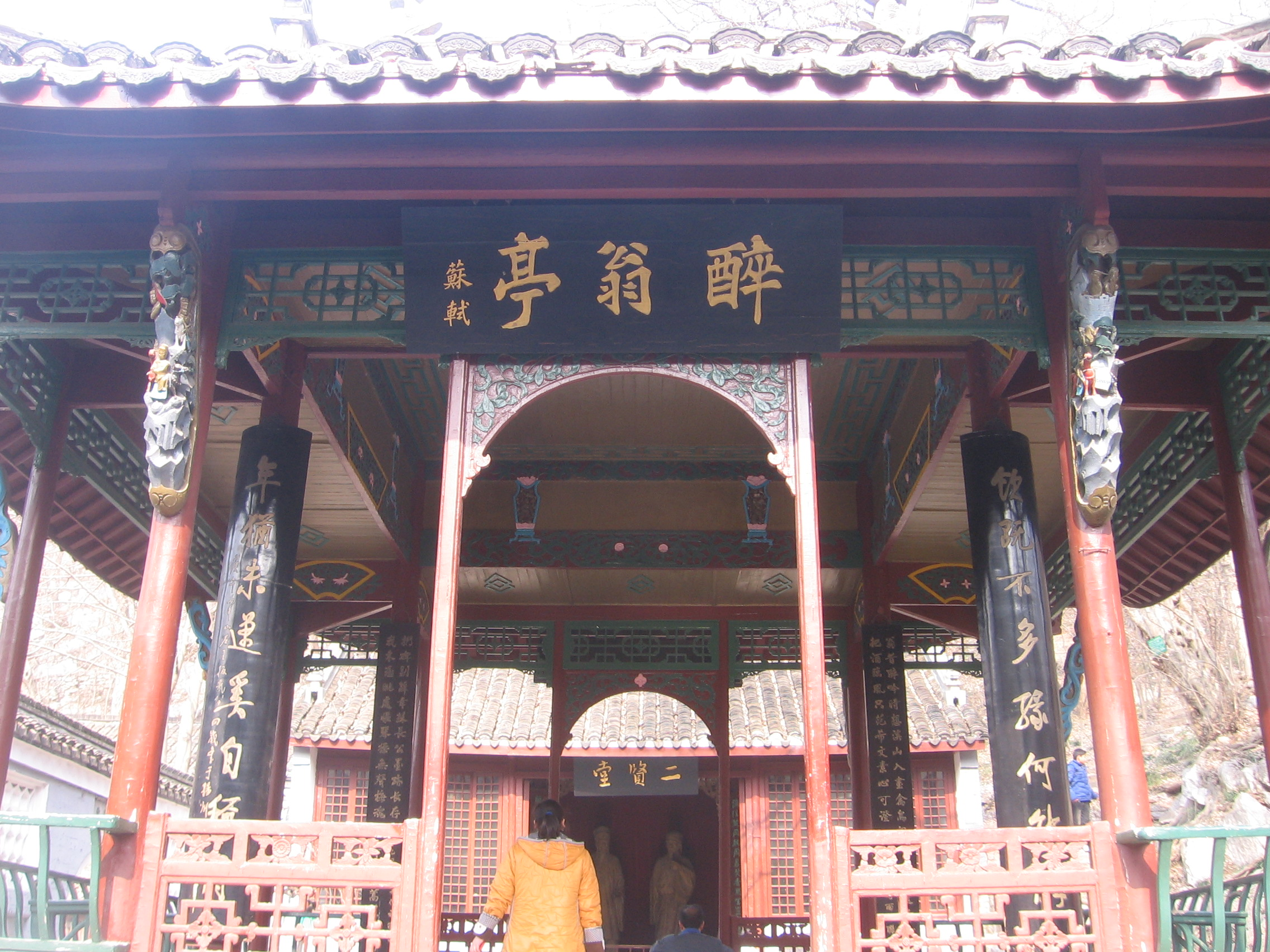
Zuiweng Pavilion

The Zuiweng Pavilion (Chinese: 醉翁亭; pinyin: Zùiwēng Tíng; lit. 'Old Toper's Pavilion') is a pavilion lying to the south east of Chuzhou City, Anhui Province, People's Republic of China. It dates to The Northern Song Dynasty whilst the structure that exists today dates to the Qing Dynasty (1644–1911). The pavilion takes its name from the Northern Song scholar, statesman, and prose writer Ouyang Xiu, who called himself the "Old Toper" and composed a widely circulated prose entitled Zuiweng Tingji or An Account of the Old Toper's Pavilion.
