= Parahenipavirus =

Virus classification
- (unranked): Virus
- Realm: Riboviria
- Kingdom: Orthornavirae
- Phylum: Negarnaviricota
- Class: Monjiviricetes
- Order: Mononegavirales
- Family: Paramyxoviridae
- Subfamily: Orthoparamyxovirinae
- Genus: Parahenipavirus

Genus of viruses

Parahenipavirus is a genus of viruses in the family Paramyxoviridae.

== Species ==
The genus contains the following species:

- Parahenipavirus chodsigoae
- Parahenipavirus crocidurae
- Parahenipavirus daeryongense
- Parahenipavirus gamakense
- Parahenipavirus jingmenense
- Parahenipavirus langyaense
- Parahenipavirus meliandouense
- Parahenipavirus mojiangense
- Parahenipavirus soricis
- Parahenipavirus wenzhouense
- Parahenipavirus winnikense
