= Ephrin B2 =

Protein-coding gene in the species Homo sapiens

EFNB2
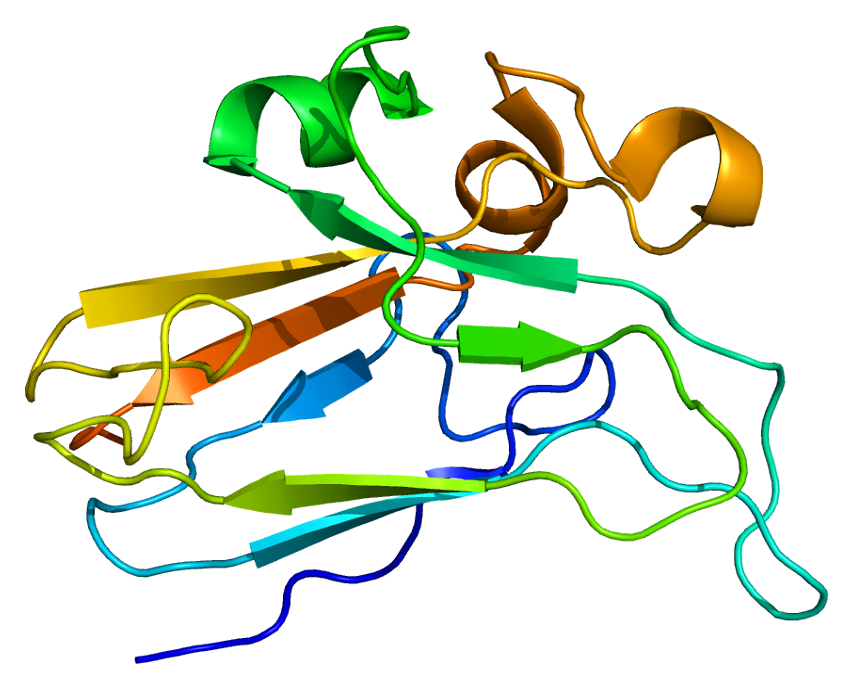

Identifiers
- Aliases: EFNB2, EPLG5, HTKL, Htk-L, LERK5, ephrin B2
- External IDs: OMIM: 600527; MGI: 105097; GeneCards: EFNB2
Available structures
PDB	Ortholog search: PDBe RCSB
PDB	List of PDB id codes 2HLE, 2I85, 2VSK, 2VSM, 2WO2, 3GXU, 4UF7

Gene location (Human)
Chr.	Chromosome 13 (human)
Band	13q33.3	Start	106,489,745 bp
Band	13q33.3	End	106,535,662 bp

Gene location (Mouse)
Chr.	Chromosome 8 (mouse)
Band	8 A1.1|8 3.42 cM	Start	8,667,434 bp
Band	8 A1.1|8 3.42 cM	End	8,711,242 bp
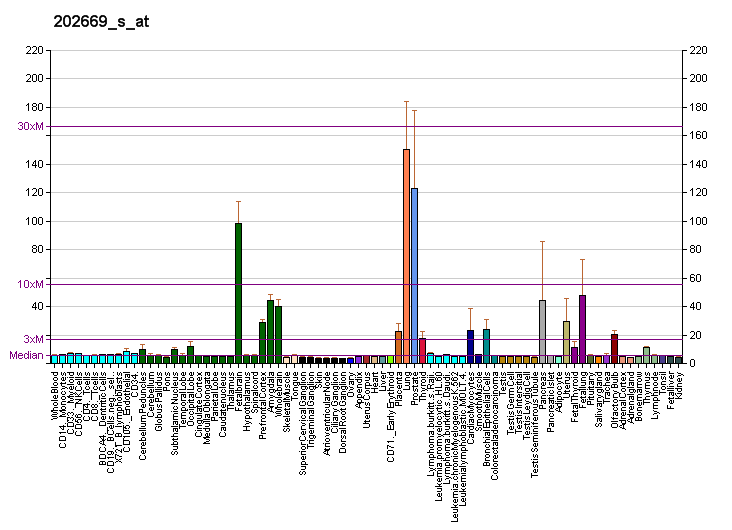

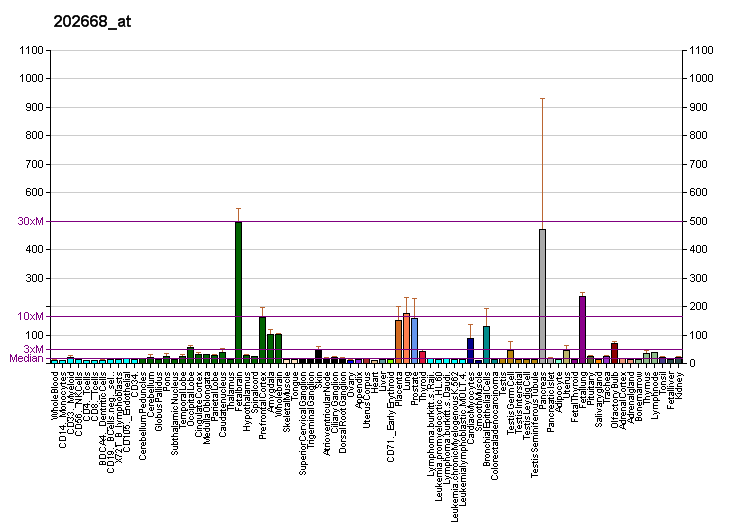
RNA expression pattern
Bgee	Human / Mouse (ortholog); Top expressed in: ventricular zone; ganglionic eminence; mucosa of sigmoid colon; visceral pleura; amniotic fluid; parietal pleura; periodontal fiber; secondary oocyte; nipple; hair follicle / Top expressed in: lumbar spinal ganglion; medullary collecting duct; renal corpuscle; hair follicle; Rostral migratory stream; right lung; left lung; ganglionic eminence; vas deferens; vestibular membrane of cochlear duct; More reference expression data
BioGPS	More reference expression data
Gene ontology
Molecular function	virus receptor activity; protein binding; signaling receptor binding; ephrin receptor binding; protein tyrosine kinase activity
Cellular component	integral component of membrane; membrane; focal adhesion; plasma membrane; integral component of plasma membrane; Schaffer collateral - CA1 synapse; glutamatergic synapse; integral component of presynaptic membrane; integral component of postsynaptic density membrane
Biological process	cell differentiation; blood vessel morphogenesis; negative regulation of keratinocyte proliferation; regulation of chemotaxis; cell-cell signaling; anatomical structure morphogenesis; T cell costimulation; lymph vessel development; nervous system development; cell migration involved in sprouting angiogenesis; multicellular organism development; cell adhesion; nephric duct morphogenesis; angiogenesis; animal organ morphogenesis; viral entry into host cell; positive regulation of cardiac muscle cell differentiation; viral process; venous blood vessel morphogenesis; positive regulation of aorta morphogenesis; positive regulation of cell population proliferation; ephrin receptor signaling pathway; axon guidance; negative regulation of neuron projection development; peptidyl-tyrosine phosphorylation; presynapse assembly; regulation of postsynaptic membrane neurotransmitter receptor levels; regulation of postsynaptic neurotransmitter receptor internalization; positive regulation of neuron death
Sources:Amigo / QuickGO
Orthologs
Databases	NCBI: entry; OMA: entry
Species	Human	Mouse
Entrez	1948	13642
Ensembl	ENSG00000125266	ENSMUSG00000001300
UniProt	P52799	P52800
RefSeq (mRNA)	NM_004093; NM_001372056; NM_001372057; NM_001372058	NM_010111; NM_001368299
RefSeq (protein)	NP_004084; NP_001358985; NP_001358986; NP_001358987	NP_034241; NP_001355228
Location (UCSC)	Chr 13: 106.49 – 106.54 Mb	Chr 8: 8.67 – 8.71 Mb
PubMed search
- Wikidata
View/Edit Human	View/Edit Mouse

Ephrin-B2 is a protein that in humans is encoded by the EFNB2 gene.

== Function ==
This gene encodes a member of the ephrin (EPH) family. The ephrins and EPH-related receptors comprise the largest subfamily of receptor protein-tyrosine kinases and have been implicated in mediating developmental events, especially in the nervous system and in erythropoiesis. Based on their structures and sequence relationships, ephrins are divided into the ephrin-A (EFNA) class, which are anchored to the membrane by a glycosylphosphatidylinositol linkage, and the ephrin-B (EFNB) class, which are transmembrane proteins. This gene encodes an EFNB class ephrin which binds to the EPHB4 and EPHA3 receptors.

== Cancer ==
EFNB2 gene has been observed progressively downregulated in Human papillomavirus-positive neoplastic keratinocytes derived from uterine cervical preneoplastic lesions at different levels of malignancy. For this reason, EFNB2 is likely to be associated with tumorigenesis and may be a potential prognostic marker for uterine cervical preneoplastic lesions progression.

== Interactions ==
EFNB2 has been shown to interact with EPHA3 and EPHB1 in optic chiasm development.

EFNB2 has also been shown to serve as a receptor for Hendra Virus and Nipah Virus, mediating entry into the cell during infection.

Ephrin-B2 has been shown to be a mediator of angiogenesis in mouse models, teasing potential for application to various forms of tissue healing. A novel study published in 2022 showed that Uterine and Splenic Natural Killer cells releasing Ephrin-B2 induced formation of endothelial microtubules in a vascular endothelial pattern.
