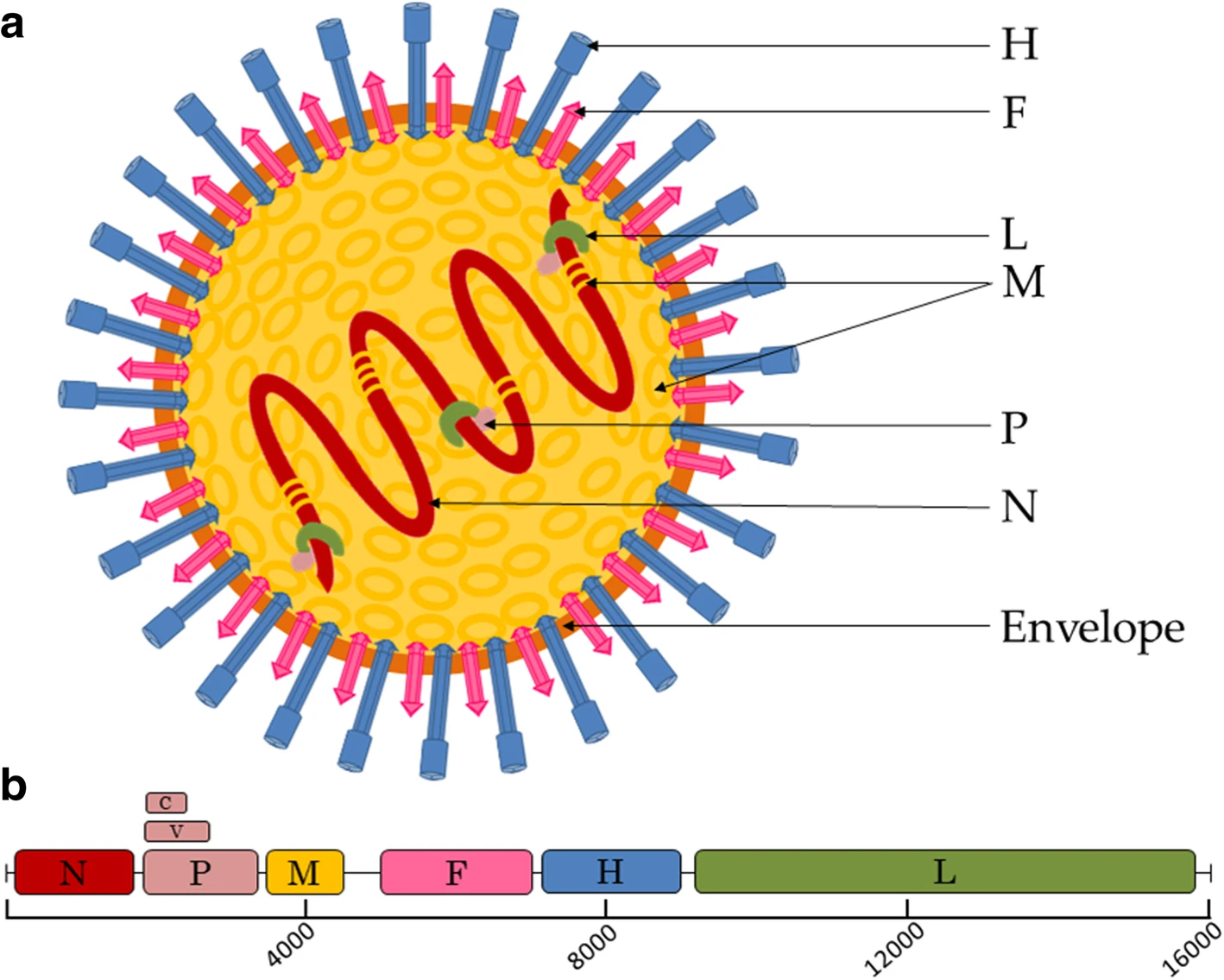
- Canine distemper virus (CDV) virion and genome organization

Virus classification
- (unranked): Virus
- Realm: Riboviria
- Kingdom: Orthornavirae
- Phylum: Negarnaviricota
- Class: Monjiviricetes
- Order: Mononegavirales
- Family: Paramyxoviridae

Subtaxa
- See text

= Paramyxoviridae =

Family of viruses

Paramyxoviridae (from Greek para- “by the side of” and myxa “mucus”) is a family of negative-strand RNA viruses in the order Mononegavirales. Vertebrates serve as natural hosts. Diseases associated with this family include measles, mumps, and respiratory tract infections. The family has nine subfamilies that contain 23 genera.

== Structure ==
Virions are enveloped and can be spherical or pleomorphic and capable of producing filamentous virions. The diameter is around 150 nm. Genomes are linear, around 15kb in length. Fusion proteins and attachment proteins appear as spikes on the virion surface. Matrix proteins inside the envelope stabilise virus structure. The nucleocapsid core is composed of the genomic RNA, nucleocapsid proteins, phosphoproteins and polymerase proteins.

== Genome ==
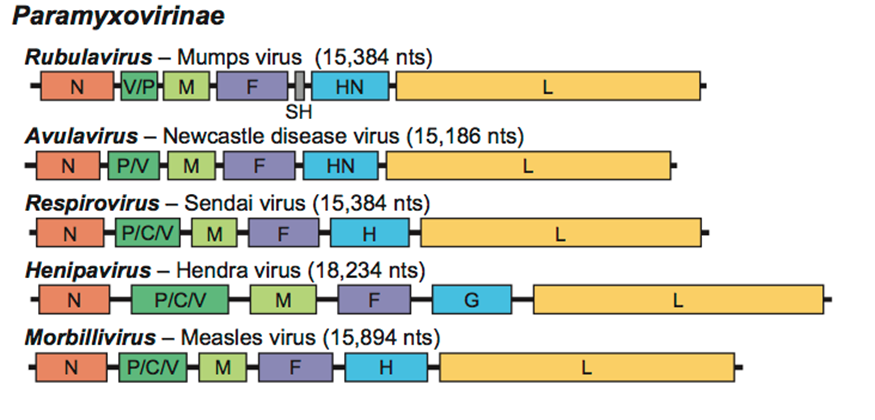
Paramyxovirus genome structure

The genome is non-segmented, negative-sense RNA, 15 to 19 kilobases in length, and contains six to 10 genes. Extracistronic (noncoding) regions include:

- A 3' leader sequence, 50 nucleotides in length, which acts as a transcriptional promoter.
- A 5' trailer sequence, 50 to 161 nucleotides long
- Intergenomic regions between each gene, which are three nucleotides long for morbilliviruses, respiroviruses, and henipaviruses, and variable length (one to 56 nucleotides) for rubulaviruses.

Gene sequence within the genome is conserved across the family due to a phenomenon known as transcriptional polarity (see Mononegavirales) in which genes closest to the 3' end of the genome are transcribed in greater abundance than those towards the 5' end. This is a result of structure of the genome. After each gene is transcribed, the RNA-dependent RNA polymerase pauses to release the new mRNA when it encounters an intergenic sequence. When the RNA polymerase is paused, a chance exists that it will dissociate from the RNA genome. If it dissociates, it must re-enter the genome at the leader sequence, rather than continuing to transcribe the length of the genome. The result is that the further downstream genes are from the leader sequence, the less they will be transcribed by RNA polymerase.

Evidence for a single promoter model was verified when viruses were exposed to UV light. UV radiation can cause dimerization of RNA, which prevents transcription by RNA polymerase. If the viral genome follows a multiple promoter model, the level inhibition of transcription should correlate with the length of the RNA gene. However, the genome was best described by a single promoter model. When paramyxovirus genome was exposed to UV light, the level of inhibition of transcription was proportional to the distance from the leader sequence. That is, the further the gene is from the leader sequence, the greater the chance of RNA dimerization inhibiting RNA polymerase.

The virus takes advantage of the single promoter model by having its genes arranged in relative order of protein needed for successful infection. For example, nucleocapsid protein (N) is needed in greater amounts than RNA polymerase (L).

Viruses in the Paramyxoviridae family are also antigenically stable, meaning that the glycoproteins on the viruses are consistent between different strains of the same type. Two reasons for this phenomenon are posited: The first is that the genome is nonsegmented, thus cannot undergo genetic reassortment. For this process to occur, segments needed as reassortment happen when segments from different strains are mixed together to create a new strain. With no segments, nothing can be mixed with one another, so no antigenic shift occurs. The second reason relates to the idea of antigenic drift. Since RNA-dependent RNA polymerase does not have an error-checking function, many mutations are made when the RNA is processed. These mutations build up and eventually new strains are created. Because of this, paramyxoviruses should not be antigenically stable, but they are. The main hypothesis behind why the viruses are antigenically stable is that each protein and amino acid has an important function. Thus, any mutation would lead to a decrease or total loss of function, which would in turn cause the new virus to be less efficient. These viruses would not be able to survive as long compared to the more virulent strains, and so would die out.

Many paramyxovirus genomes follow the "rule of six". The total length of the genome is almost always a multiple of six. This is probably due to the advantage of having all RNA bound by N protein (since N binds hexamers of RNA). If RNA is left exposed, the virus does not replicate efficiently. The gene sequence is:

Nucleocapsid – phosphoprotein – matrix – fusion – attachment – large (polymerase)

== Proteins ==
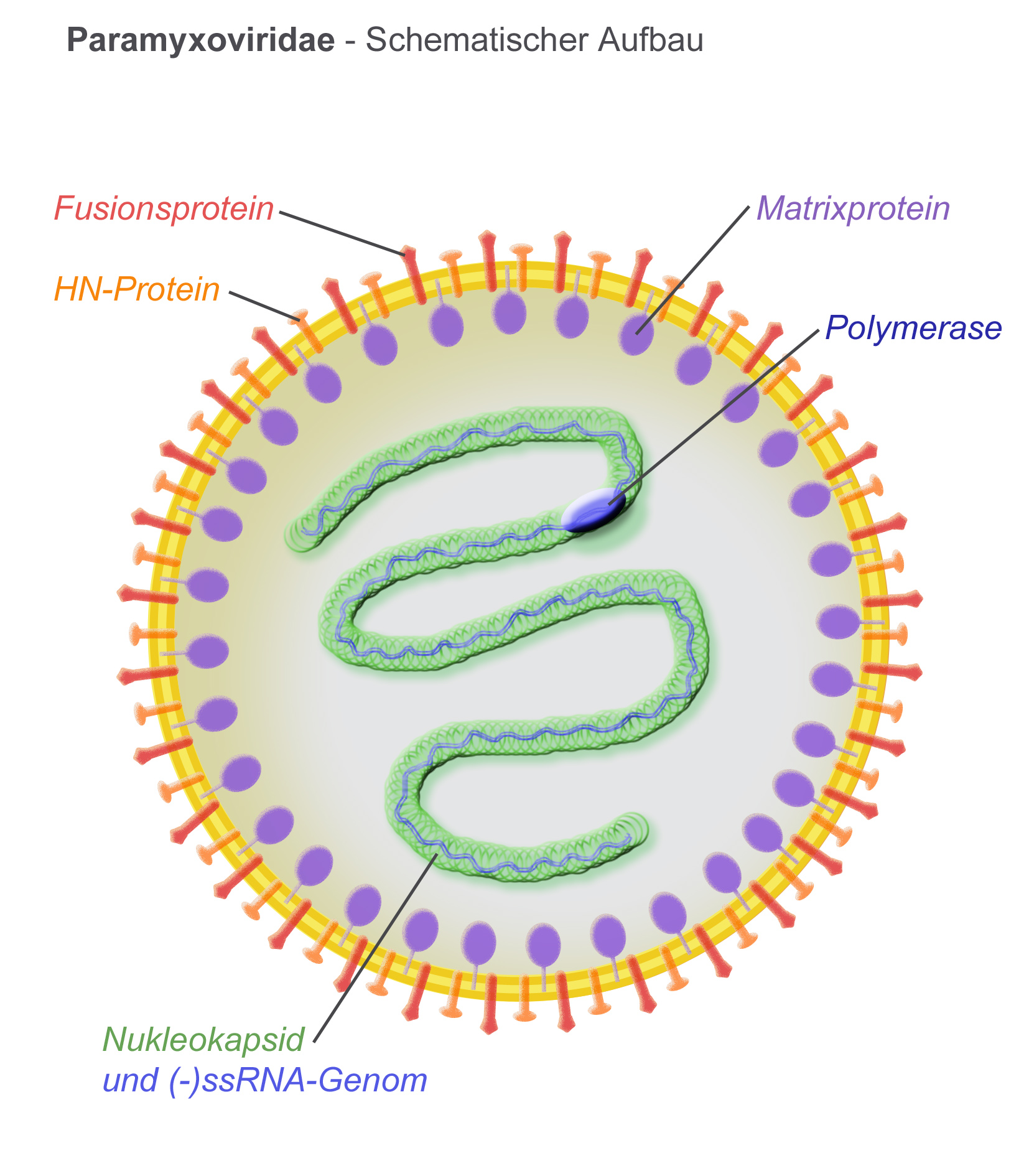
Paramyxoviridae virion illustration

- N – the nucleocapsid protein associates with genomic RNA (one molecule per hexamer) and protects the RNA from nuclease digestion
- P – the phosphoprotein binds to the N and L proteins and forms part of the RNA polymerase complex. P is the polymerase co-factor.
- M – the matrix protein assembles between the envelope and the nucleocapsid core, it organizes and maintains virion structure
- F – the fusion protein projects from the envelope surface as a trimer, and mediates cell entry by inducing fusion between the viral envelope and the cell membrane by class I fusion. One of the defining characteristics of members of the family Paramyxoviridae is the requirement for a neutral pH for fusogenic activity.
- H/HN/G – the cell attachment proteins span the viral envelope and project from the surface as spikes. They bind to proteins on the surface of target cells to facilitate cell entry. Proteins are designated H (hemagglutinin) for morbilliviruses as they possess haemagglutination activity, observed as an ability to cause red blood cells to clump in laboratory tests. HN (Hemagglutinin-neuraminidase) attachment proteins occur in respiroviruses, rubulaviruses and avulaviruses. These possess both haemagglutination and neuraminidase activity, which cleaves sialic acid on the cell surface, preventing viral particles from reattaching to previously infected cells. Attachment proteins with neither haemagglutination nor neuraminidase activity are designated G (glycoprotein). These occur in henipaviruses.
- L – the large protein is the catalytic subunit of RNA-dependent RNA polymerase (RDRP)
- Accessory proteins – a mechanism known as RNA editing (see Mononegavirales) allows multiple proteins to be produced from the P gene. These are not essential for replication but may aid in survival in vitro or may be involved in regulating the switch from mRNA synthesis to antigenome synthesis.

== Life cycle ==
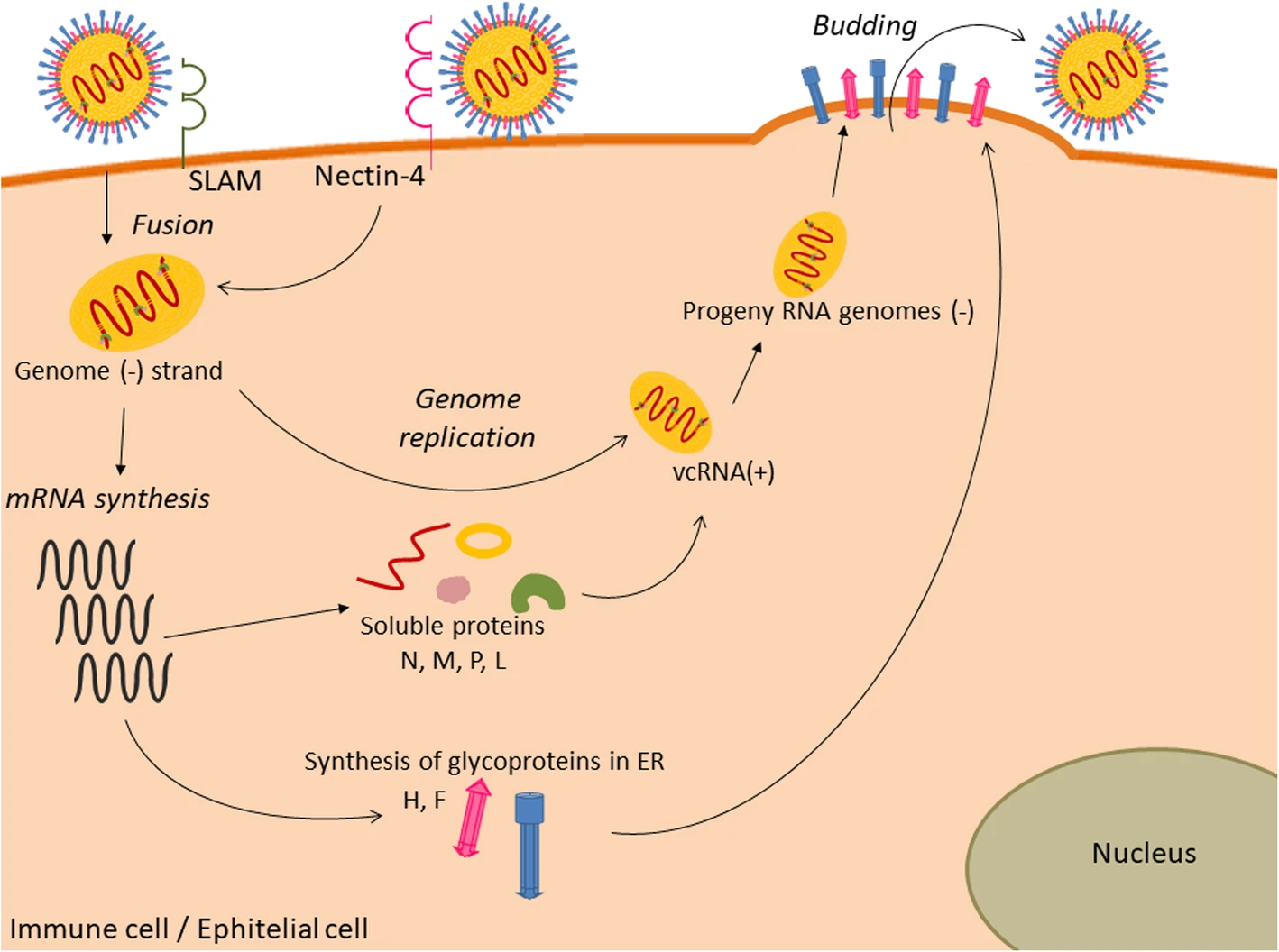
Replication of the canine distemper virus (CDV) cycle.

Viral replication is cytoplasmic. Entry into the host cell is achieved by viral attachment to host cell. Replication and transcription follow the negative-stranded RNA virus models. Translation takes place by leaky scanning, ribosomal shunting, and RNA termination-reinitiation. The virus exits the host cell by budding. Vertebrates, including humans and birds serve as the natural hosts. Transmission route is airborne particles.

The Paramyxoviridae are able to undergo mRNA editing, which produces different proteins from the same mRNA transcript by slipping back one base to read off in a different open reading frame (ORF) due to the presence of secondary structures such as pseudoknots. Paramyxoviridae also undergo transcriptional stuttering to produce the poly (A) tail at the end of mRNA transcripts by repeatedly moving back one nucleotide at a time at the end of the RNA template.

== Taxonomy ==
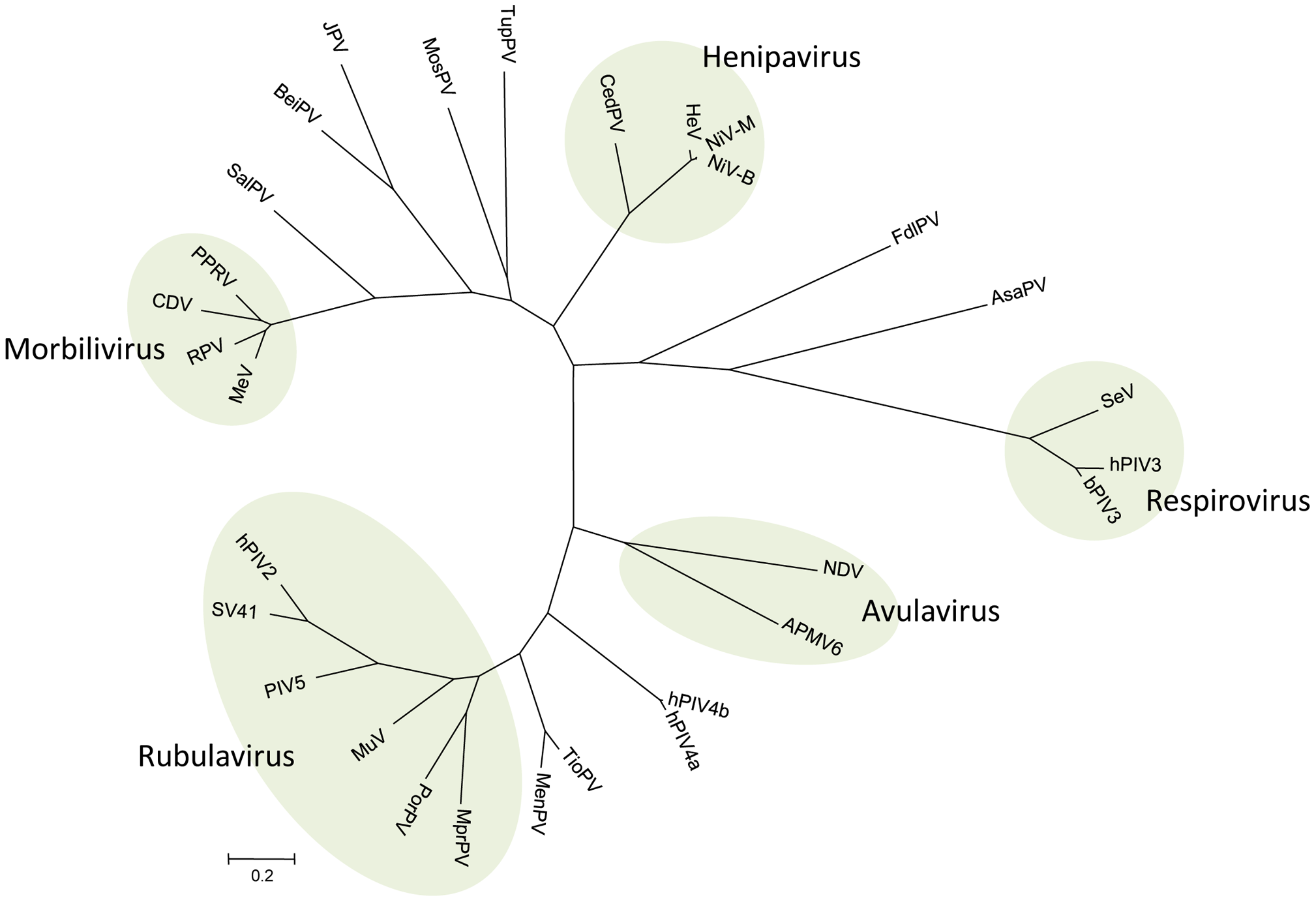
Phylogenetic tree of paramyxoviruses

The family contains the following subfamilies and genera (-virinae denotes subfamily and -virus denotes genus):

- Avulavirinae
  - Metaavulavirus
  - Orthoavulavirus
  - Paraavulavirus
- Feraresvirinae
  - Aquaparamyxovirus
  - Ferlavirus
  - Respirovirus
- Glossavirinae
  - Cynoglossusvirus
- Ichthysvirinae
  - Hoplichthysvirus
- Kamposvirinae
  - Hippocavirus
- Metaparamyxovirinae
  - Synodonvirus
- Orthoparamyxovirinae
  - Bovinavirus
  - Henipavirus
  - Jeilongvirus
  - Morbillivirus
  - Narmovirus
  - Parahenipavirus
  - Parajeilongvirus
  - Paramorbillivirus
  - Salemvirus
  - Tupaivirus
- Rubulavirinae
  - Orthorubulavirus
  - Pararubulavirus
- Skoliovirinae
  - Scoliodonvirus

== Pathogenic paramyxoviruses ==
A number of important human diseases are caused by paramyxoviruses. These include mumps, as well as measles, which caused around 136,200 deaths in 2022.

The human parainfluenza viruses (HPIV) are the second most common causes of respiratory tract disease in infants and children. There are four types of HPIVs, known as HPIV-1, HPIV-2, HPIV-3 and HPIV-4. HPIV-1 and HPIV-2 may cause cold-like symptoms, along with croup in children. HPIV-3 is associated with bronchiolitis, bronchitis, and pneumonia. HPIV-4 is less common than the other types, and is known to cause mild to severe respiratory tract illnesses.

Paramyxoviruses are also responsible for a range of diseases in other animal species, for example canine distemper virus (dogs), phocine distemper virus (seals), cetacean morbillivirus (dolphins and porpoises), Newcastle disease virus (birds), and rinderpest virus (cattle).

Some paramyxoviruses, such as the henipaviruses, are zoonotic pathogens, occurring naturally in an animal host, but also able to infect humans. Hendra virus and Nipah virus in the genus Henipavirus have emerged in humans and livestock in Australia and Southeast Asia. Both viruses are contagious, highly virulent, and capable of infecting a number of mammalian species and causing potentially fatal disease. Due to the lack of either a licensed human vaccine (a Hendra virus vaccine exists for horses) or antiviral therapies, Hendra virus and Nipah virus are designated as Biosafety level (BSL) 4 agents. The genomic structure of both viruses is that of a typical paramyxovirus.

== Diversity and evolution ==
Novel paramyxoviruses have been discovered in both terrestrial and aquatic animals, demonstrating a vast host range and great viral genetic diversity. As molecular technology advances and viral surveillance programs are implemented, the discovery of new viruses in this group is increasing.

The evolution of paramyxoviruses is still debated. Using pneumoviruses (mononegaviral family Pneumoviridae) as an outgroup, paramyxoviruses can be divided into two clades: one consisting of avulaviruses and rubulaviruses and one consisting of respiroviruses, henipaviruses, and morbilliviruses. Within the second clade the respiroviruses appear to be the basal group. The respirovirus-henipavirus-morbillivirus clade may be basal to the avulavirus-rubulavirus clade.

== See also ==
- Animal virology
- Virology
