= Feline morbillivirus =

Virus classification
- (unranked): Virus
- Realm: Riboviria
- Kingdom: Orthornavirae
- Phylum: Negarnaviricota
- Class: Monjiviricetes
- Order: Mononegavirales
- Family: Paramyxoviridae
- Genus: Morbillivirus
- Species: Morbillivirus felis

Species of virus

Feline morbillivirus (Morbillivirus felis) is virus of the genus Morbillivirus that infects wild and domestic cats. The first report of a feline morbillivirus outbreak occurred in Hong Kong in 2012. About 10% of stray cats in Hong Kong and mainland China were reported to have the virus at the time with further infections found in Japan as well. 40% of cats tested in Japan were Fmo-PV positive and exhibited early symptoms of kidney failure. While the first cases of Feline morbillivirus were found in China, Hong Kong and Japan, the virus is also found in Italy, Germany, and the United States. Feline morbillivirus exhibits a substantial amount of genetic diversity, yet cases in Japan and Hong Kong proved to have identical nucleotide sequences. It is also hypothesized that the morbillivirus has high adaptability due to its presence in multiple species. It is often found in dogs, cats, cattle, whales, dolphins, porpoises, and even humans. It likely originated from an ancestral version and underwent viral evolution to adapt to transmission in different species. Other morbilliviruses include measles, rinderpest, canine distemper and ovine rinderpest.

== Genome ==
Feline morbillivirus, like all morbilliviruses, has a negative-strand RNA genome.

== Structure ==
This virus has a spherical shape with an enveloped capsid and is about 150 nm in diameter. The capsid is covered by fusion and hemagglutinin proteins. Inside the capsid exists the negative-sense RNA genome, which is covered by nucleoproteins and matrix proteins, as well as a polymerase and phosphoprotein toward the end of the genetic material. The genome itself is arranged in a linear pattern and is about 15-16kb in length. It is known as the largest of all morbilliviruses due to its makeup of 16,050 base pairs. Guanine and cytosine pairings make up a considerable portion of the viral genome, ranging from 35.1% to 35.3%, in comparison to adenine and thymine. Morbilliviruses have a 3’ leader sequence and a 5’ trailer sequence typically made up of 40 or 41 nt. Feline morbillivirus, however, breaks the typical 5’ trailer sequence rule and has an unusually long sequence of 400 nt. The genome encodes for eight different proteins: N, C, P, V, M, F, H, and L. The L protein, also called large protein, is involved in ATP binding, RNA polymerase activity and mRNA methyltransferase activity. Thus, it is a multifunctional enzyme. The N gene exhibits the greatest incidence of nucleotide polymorphism, while P protein has the highest incidence of amino acid polymorphism.

== Viral classification ==
Feline morbillivirus is classified as the species Morbillivirus felis, genus Morbillivirus, subfamily Orthoparamyxovirinae, family Paramyxoviridae.

== Replication cycle ==
The genus Morbillivirus is fairly well known among various wild and domesticated species, while the discovery of this virus in felines is relatively new. Therefore, what is known about the replication cycle in felines can be extrapolated from experiments done on other animals. A ferret model was used to test the entry, spread and transmission of the virus in the organism. In the ferret model, the virus was transmitted through contact with bodily fluids, infected foods and airborne contact with an infected ferret. While Fmo-PV is most often associated with attacking associated renal tissues, the virus is also compatible with receptors on the following cells: epithelial, glial, fibroblastic, and lymphoid cells. This increases the risk of transmission to other areas of the body, as well as subsequent failure of the affected tissues.

== Entry ==
Morbilliviruses enter a cell by attaching onto the host cell via viral glycoproteins. Specifically, CD150 acts as a receptor for viral entry into the cell. The receptor itself is often expressed on dendritic cells, macrophages, B-cells and T-cells. This offers clear information as to why morbilliviruses can very quickly infect immune cells. Another newly discovered cellular receptor called PVRL4 allows for morbillivirus entry into bronchial epithelial cells and keratinocytes. Also, the Feline morbillivirus F protein is known to have a single cleavage site that splits the protein into separate F1 and F2 proteins which play an important role in fusing the viral and cellular membranes together during entry.

== Replication and transcription ==
Since this virus has a negative-sense RNA genome, its replication and transcription cycles follow that of the negative-RNA genome. Therefore, to replicate, the negative, single-stranded RNA genome must use RNA-dependent RNA polymerase to generate the positive strand of RNA, which can directly be made into protein by host ribosomes. Likewise, both the positive and negative RNA strands must be present for replication of the genome to occur. RNA-dependent RNA polymerase binds the 3’ end of the viral genome and begins transcription, regularly identifying start and stop signals along the way which edge the genes. During mRNA synthesis, the viral “L” protein aids in capping and polyadenylating the product. Replication occurs in the cytoplasm of the host cell; it begins by the viral H glycoprotein attaching to the surface of the host cell. The virus is then fused with the cell and releases its ribonucleocapsid, allowing for transcription of the genome into mRNA, as well as sequential capping and polyadenylation of the mRNA. Before replication starts, enough nucleoprotein must be available to shield the viral genome.

== Assembly and release ==
Assembly takes place in the cytoplasm while release of the virion takes place via budding off from the host cell membrane. The virus transmits from host to host via respiratory droppings, which was revealed via the ferret model.

== Modulation of host processes ==
The virion interacts with its host and manipulates its cell machinery in various ways. It enters using the cell's own receptors, which were not originally designed for viral entry. Specifically, the receptors CD150 and PVRL4 are used for viral entry into their respective bodily regions. CD150 can be found on many immune cells including: macrophages, dendritic cells, B-cells and T-cells. PVRL4 is present in keratinocytes of the epidermis and bronchial epithelial cells. Also, the viral V protein is known to have a role in inhibiting MDA-5 antiviral signaling, which acts to increase interferon production in the face of infection. Once virally infected, MDA-5 sends out signals corresponding with an antiviral state in order that fewer interferons be produced to interfere with viral replication. While the virus uses its own enzyme to make a copy of its genome, it hijacks host ribosomes to translate its RNA into protein. Specifically in felines, the virus is known to interact with the renal system, but in other species it has been known to negatively influence the respiratory, epithelial, immune and central nervous systems.

== Associated diseases ==
This virus is often affiliated with tubulointerstitial nephritis in domestic cats. A study was done on domestic cats by Woo et al., and those tested Fmo-PV positive also exhibited symptoms of kidney disease, namely necrosis of the tissues and degeneration of the renal tubules. Expression of cauxin protein was also diminished, which correlates with tubulointerstitial nephritis. Cauxin plays a role in the production of felinine and glycine, which act as feline pheromones; cats use these as territorial markers. In cases of tubulointerstitial nephritis brought on by feline morbillivirus, cauxin levels are significantly depleted. In other animals as well, morbillivirus is connected to acute febrile respiratory tract infection. It is also hypothesized that Fmo-PV could be linked to CNS disease due to the fact that G355-5 cells are susceptible to feline morbillivirus, and these cells originate from astrocytes, glial cells of the central nervous system.

== Tropism ==
The specific body tissues associated with morbillivirus growth and proliferation include: epithelial, renal, immune and central nervous tissues. In these various systems, the virus is able to bind to the receptors available and successfully hijack cell machinery in order to replicate and create viral proteins.
