= Cetacean morbillivirus =

Virus classification
- (unranked): Virus
- Realm: Riboviria
- Kingdom: Orthornavirae
- Phylum: Negarnaviricota
- Class: Monjiviricetes
- Order: Mononegavirales
- Family: Paramyxoviridae
- Genus: Morbillivirus
- Species: Morbillivirus ceti

Strains
- Dolphin morbillivirus (DMV); Pilot whale morbillivirus (PWMV); Porpoise morbillivirus (PMV)

Species of virus

Cetacean morbillivirus (CeMV) is a virus that infects marine mammals in the clade Cetacea (dolphins, porpoises and whales). Three genetically distinct strains have been identified: dolphin morbillivirus (DMV), pilot whale morbillivirus (PWMV) and porpoise morbillivirus (PMV). Symptoms are often a severe combination of pneumonia, encephalitis and immune system damage, which greatly impair the ability to swim and stay afloat unassisted. Since its discovery in 1987, CeMV has caused many epizootics of mass mortality in cetacean populations. Epizootics of CeMV can be easily identified by a significant increase in the number of stranded cetaceans on beaches and shores.
