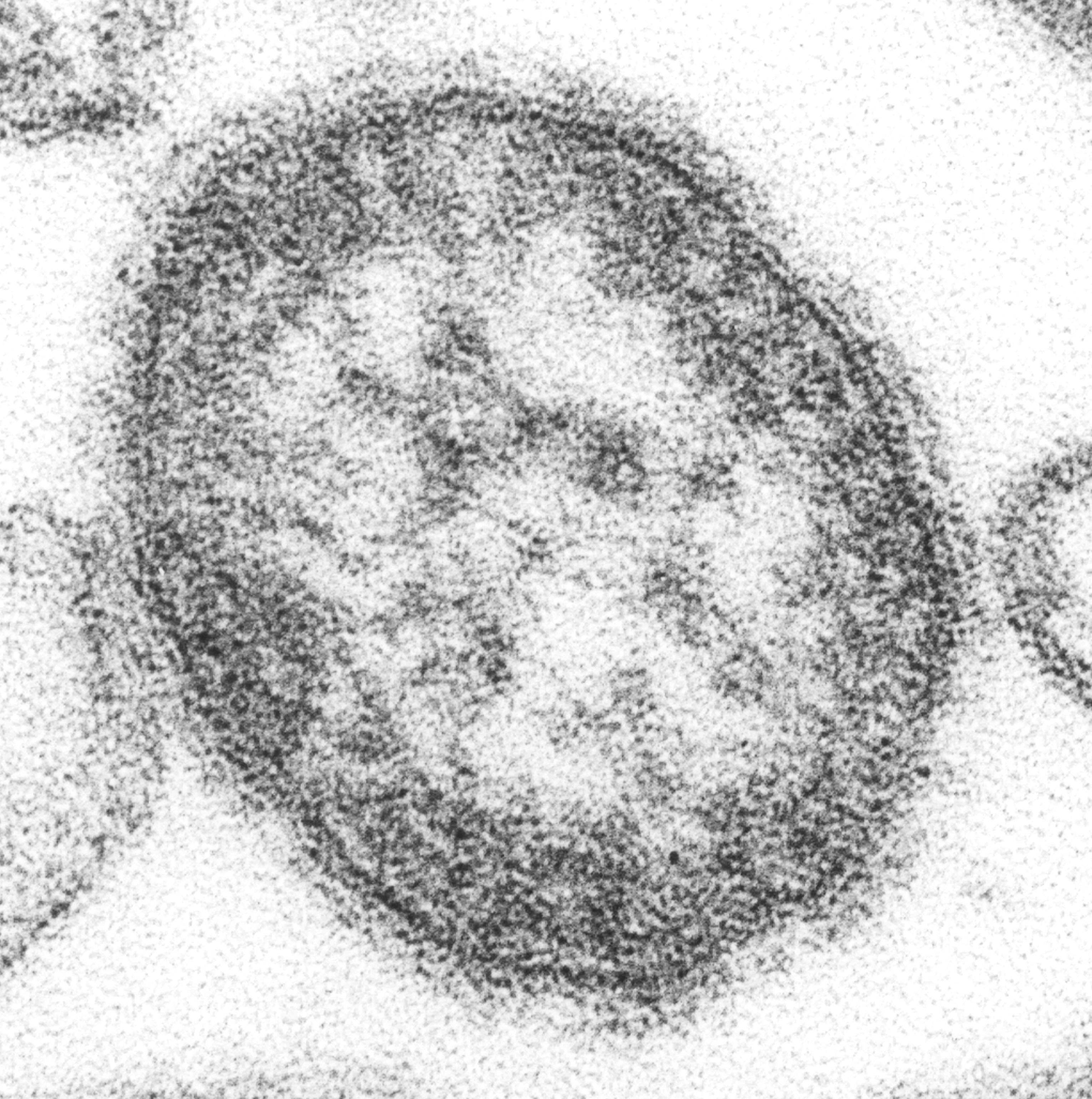
- Measles virus electron micrograph

Virus classification
- (unranked): Virus
- Realm: Riboviria
- Kingdom: Orthornavirae
- Phylum: Negarnaviricota
- Class: Monjiviricetes
- Order: Mononegavirales
- Family: Paramyxoviridae
- Subfamily: Orthoparamyxovirinae
- Genus: Morbillivirus

Species
- See text

= Morbillivirus =

Genus of viruses

Morbillivirus is a genus of viruses in the order Mononegavirales, in the family Paramyxoviridae. Humans, dogs, cats, cattle, seals, and cetaceans serve as natural hosts. This genus contains 10 species, one of which is extinct. Diseases in humans associated with viruses classified in this genus include measles; in animals, they include acute febrile respiratory tract infection and Canine distemper. In 2013, a wave of increased death among the Common bottlenose dolphin population was attributed to morbillivirus.

== Taxonomy ==
The genus contains the following species, listed by scientific name and followed by the exemplar virus of the species:

- Morbillivirus canis, Canine distemper virus
- Morbillivirus caprinae, Peste-des-petits-ruminants virus
- Morbillivirus ceti, Cetacean morbillivirus
- Morbillivirus felis, Feline morbillivirus
- Morbillivirus hominis, Measles virus
- Morbillivirus myotis, Myotis bat morbillivirus
- †Morbillivirus pecoris, Rinderpest virus
- Morbillivirus phocae, Phocine distemper virus
- Morbillivirus phyllostomi, Phyllostomus bat morbillivirus
- Morbillivirus suis, Porcine morbillivirus

== Structure ==
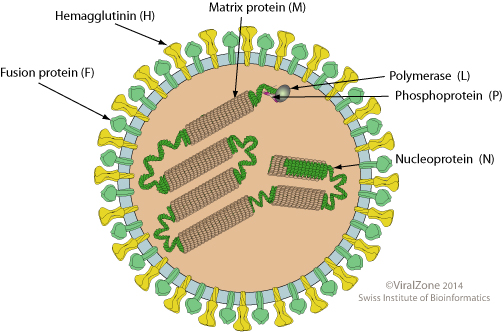
Schematic diagram of a Morbillivirus virion (cross section)

Morbillivirions are enveloped, with spherical geometries. Their diameter is around 150 nm. Genomes are linear, around 15–16 kb in length. The genome codes for eight proteins.

Genus	Structure	Symmetry	Capsid	Genomic arrangement	Genomic segmentation
Morbillivirus	Spherical		Enveloped	Linear	Monopartite

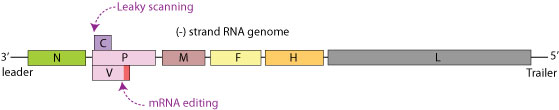
Morbillivirus genome map

== Life cycle ==
Viral replication is cytoplasmic. Entry into the host cell is achieved by virus attaching to host cell. Replication follows the negative-stranded RNA virus replication model. Negative-stranded RNA virus transcription, using polymerase stuttering, through co-transcriptional RNA editing is the method of transcription. Translation takes place by leaky scanning. The virus exits the host cell by budding. Humans, cattle, dogs, cats, and cetaceans serve as the natural hosts. Infection from this virus takes place in five stages: incubation, prodromal, mucosal, diarrheic, and convalescent. Transmission routes are respiratory. Morbillivirus are sensitive to high temperatures, sunlight, extreme pH levels, and any chemical that can destroy its outer envelope.

Genus	Host details	Tissue tropism	Entry details	Release details	Replication site	Assembly site	Transmission
Morbillivirus	Humans, dogs, cats, cetaceans	None	Glycoprotein	Budding	Cytoplasm	Cytoplasm	Aerosols
