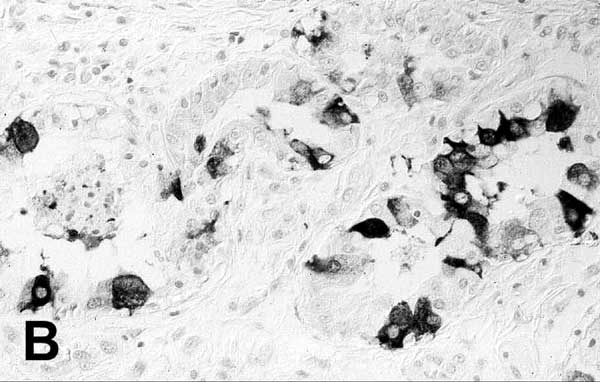
- Immunohistochemical staining of the lung of a seal with PDV infection
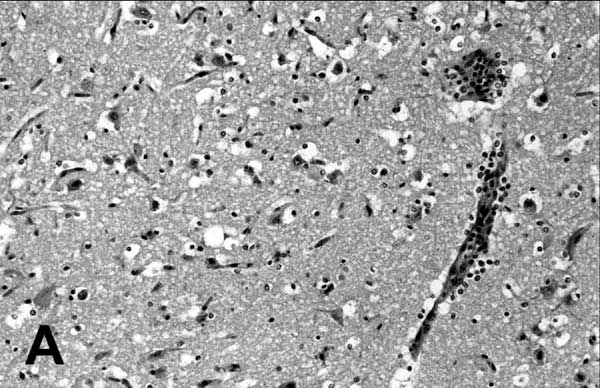
- Encephalitis in the cerebral cortex of a harbor seal with PDV, stained with hematoxylin and eosin

Virus classification
- (unranked): Virus
- Realm: Riboviria
- Kingdom: Orthornavirae
- Phylum: Negarnaviricota
- Class: Monjiviricetes
- Order: Mononegavirales
- Family: Paramyxoviridae
- Genus: Morbillivirus
- Species: Morbillivirus phocae

Synonyms
- Phocine morbillivirus

= Phocine distemper virus =

Species of virus

Phocine distemper virus (PDV), is a paramyxovirus of the genus Morbillivirus that is pathogenic for pinniped species, particularly seals. Clinical signs include laboured breathing, fever and central nervous system symptoms.

PDV was first identified in 1988 as the cause of death of 18,000 harbor seals (Phoca vitulina) and 300 grey seals (Halichoerus grypus) along the northern European coast.

In 2002, an epizootic of PDV along the North Sea coast resulted in the deaths of 21,700 seals, estimated to be 51% of the population.

Antibodies to PDV have been found in a number of carnivorous mammal species in the Western North Atlantic, including polar bears, and the Atlantic walrus.

The suddenness of the emergence of PDV and related viruses in aquatic mammals has implicated environmental changes as the cause. Pollutants have been posited as contributors by interfering with the ability of animals to mount a defense against infection. Alternatively, climate change and overfishing may have forced aquatic species that naturally harbour the viruses into new areas, exposing immunologically susceptible populations.
