= Ovine rinderpest =

Morbillivirus caprinae

Virus classification
- (unranked): Virus
- Realm: Riboviria
- Kingdom: Orthornavirae
- Phylum: Negarnaviricota
- Class: Monjiviricetes
- Order: Mononegavirales
- Family: Paramyxoviridae
- Genus: Morbillivirus
- Species: Morbillivirus caprinae

Synonyms
- Peste-des-petits-ruminants virus; Pest des petits ruminants virus

Contagious disease primarily affecting goats and sheep

Ovine rinderpest, also commonly known as peste des petits ruminants (PPR), is a contagious disease primarily affecting goats and sheep; however, camels and wild small ruminants can also be affected. PPR is currently present in North, Central, West, and East Africa, the Middle East, South Asia, and Southern Europe. It is caused by Morbillivirus caprinae in the genus Morbillivirus, and is closely related to, among others, Morbillivirus pecoris (rinderpest), Morbillivirus hominis (measles virus), and Morbillivirus canis (also known as canine distemper virus). The disease is highly contagious, and can have an 80–100% mortality rate in acute cases in an epizootic setting. The virus does not infect humans.

The disease was first described in 1942 in Ivory Coast and has since been detected in more than 70 countries in the world.

In 2017, the disease was reported to be affecting saiga antelope in Mongolia, causing near-catastrophic herd depletion for the endangered species.

In 2018, the disease was reported to be present in Bulgaria close to the border with Turkey. In a flock of 540 sheep and goats, two animals tested positive and one died, with disease confirmed by only one laboratory without any further tests. Nevertheless, over 4000 sheep and goats were killed. The recent outbreaks in European Union (EU) countries such as Romania, Greece, and Hungary have highlighted the vulnerability of the PPR-free countries. These countries have had their free status suspended following outbreaks in 2022 and 2023, highlighting the critical need for robust surveillance, coordinated vaccination, and effective buffer-zone strategies.

== Synonyms ==
PPR is also known as goat plague, kata, syndrome of stomatitis-pneumoenteritis, and ovine rinderpest.

Official agencies such as the FAO and OIE use the French name "peste des petits ruminants", with several spelling variants.

== Signs and symptoms ==
Symptoms are similar to those of rinderpest in cattle and involves oral necrosis, mucopurulent nasal and ocular discharges, cough, pneumonia, and diarrhea, though they vary according to the previous immune status of the sheep, the geographic location, and the time of year, or if the infection is new or chronic. They also vary according to the breed of sheep. However, fever in addition to either diarrhea or signs of oral discomfort is sufficient to suspect the diagnosis. Incubation period is 3–5 days.

=== Hyperacute cases ===
Hyperacute cases are found dead without previous symptoms. They die with a serous, foamy, or haemorrhagic discharge coming out of the nose.

=== Acute cases at onset ===
In acute cases, animals are recumbent, sometimes in self-auscultation position. Body temperature is high (40.5 to 41.0 °C) in the beginning of the onset in acute cases. The most typical signs are seen in the digestive tract. When entering an affected flock, one sees many animals with hind limbs stained by sticky faeces. Some sheep have an arched back and show pain when defecating. Tenesmus may be noticed when taking rectal temperature. Fluid faeces are olive green to brown. Examination of the mouth shows ulceration of the buccal mucosae, especially on the inner face of the lips, and neighboring gum. There can be periodontitis or serous nasal exudate and conjunctivitis.

=== Evolution of acute cases ===
Nasal discharge becomes mucopurulent and may obstruct the nose. A dry, fitful coughing develops. Death occurs from 5 to 10 days after the onset of the fever. Some animals may recover, but a dry, stertorous coughing often persists for some days. Besides coughing, there is intensive labial dermatitis with scab formation, resembling orf. Miscarriages may occur.

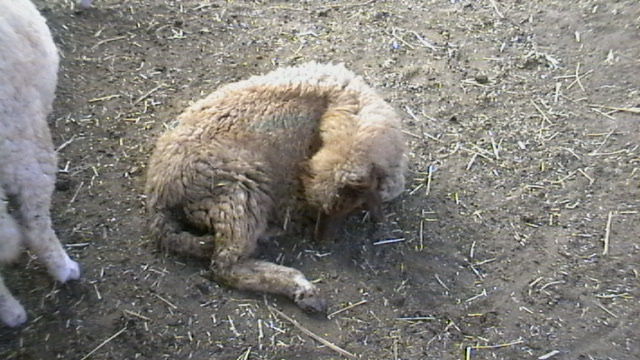
Self-auscultation in an acute case

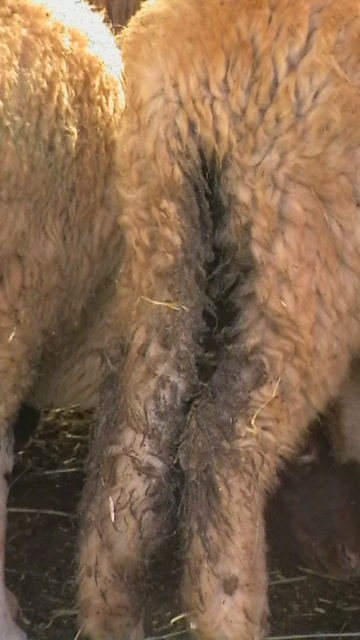
Hind legs stained with sticky diarrhoea

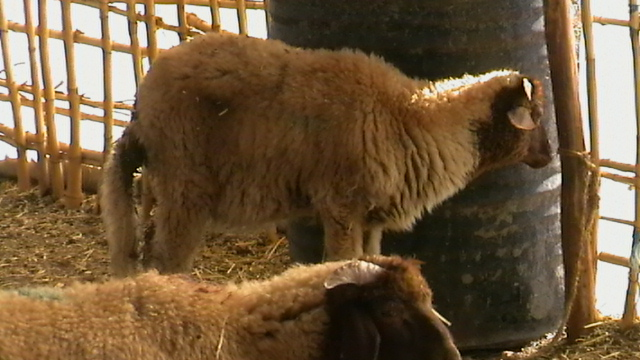
Arched back (painful defecation)

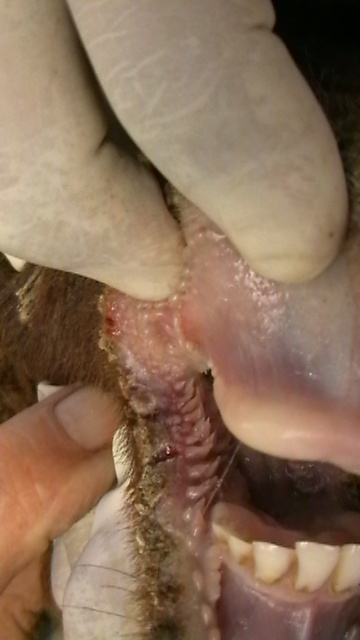
inflammation and erosion of the mouth

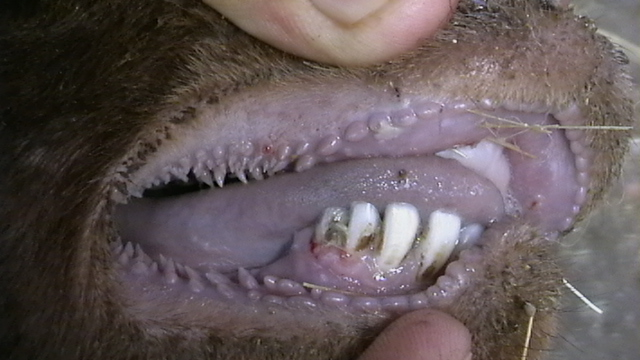
Periodontitis

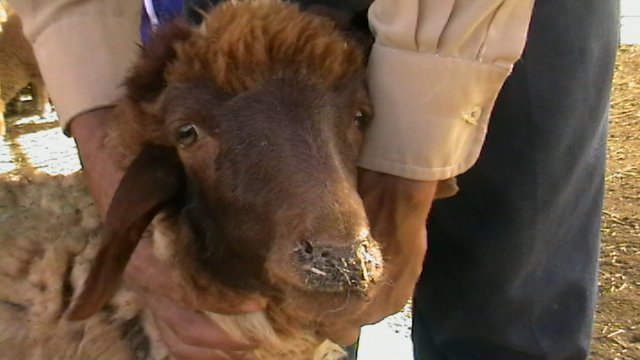
Mucopurulent nasal exudate

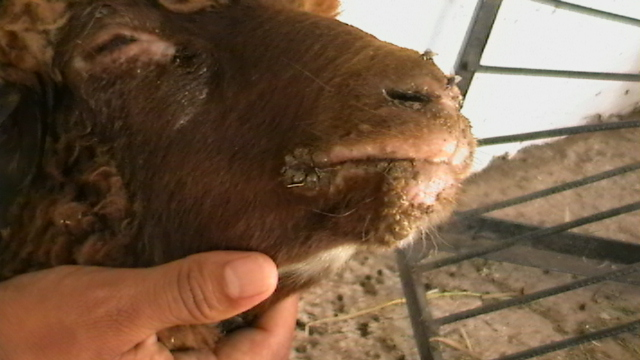
Orf-like scabs on lips in a recovering case, Day 8

== Cause ==
Peste des petits ruminants is caused by a Morbillivirus – Morbillivirus caprinae – which is related to but distinct from the now extirpated rinderpest virus. Four genotypes (lineages) of the virus are described. Their classification is based on the nucleoprotein (N) or previously the fusion (F) protein gene. Lineages I and II are found mainly in West Africa. Lineage III is generally found in East Africa. Lineage IV was long known as the Asian lineage, but has now spread to the African continent and become the most prevalent lineage of all.

== Epidemiology ==
=== Origin and spread ===
This virus appears to have evolved at the start of the 20th century in Nigeria. The extant genotypes subsequently appeared in West Africa (lineages I and II), East Africa and Arabia (lineage III), and Pakistan–India (lineage IV).

The first description of the disease was published in 1942 and relates to an outbreak in Ivory Coast, West Africa, in goats and sheep in 1940. It spread to East Africa and Arabia at the beginning of the 1980s and to Pakistan and India in the early 1990s (Calcutta goat markets) finally reaching Tibet in 2007. The first description of this virus in India was in 1987.

The outbreak in Burkina Faso in 1999 was caused by the lineage I group. Genotype III has caused outbreaks in Ethiopia (1996) and also in Arabia, southern India, and Tamil Nadu (1992). This lineage was found in Yemen in 2001. Genotype IV has been isolated in Kuwait in 1999.

=== Geographical repartition ===
As of 2017, the disease is present in West Africa, part of Central Africa (Gabon, Central African Republic), East Africa (north of the Equator), the Middle East, and the Indian subcontinent including Nepal and Myanmar. The disease is endemic in the Indian subcontinent and is a major threat to fast-growing goat husbandry in India, causing an annual loss of around 1800 million Indian rupees.

In North Africa, only Egypt was once hit, but since summer 2008, Morocco is suffering a generalized outbreak with 133 known cases in 129 provinces, mostly affecting sheep. The outbreak has precipitated the vaccination of a large number of the 17 million sheep and five million goats in the country.

=== Dissemination ===
The disease is transmitted by infected aerosols in situation of close contact of animals. The long-distance spread is by sick animals. As the virus soon becomes inactive outside the body, indirect contamination is generally limited.

In an affected flock, even in pest-free regions, the disease does not progress very rapidly, in spite of the close contact between animals. New clinical cases may be observed daily for a 1-month period.

== Post mortem lesions ==
The lesions are situated in the digestive tract. Quick post mortem examination will lead to the discovery of many haemorrhagic patches on the serous membranes, and intense pneumonia. A risk exists that it may conclude with enzootic pneumonia, inability to open the mouth, and problems with the oesophagus and different parts of the intestine.

Erosions and inflammation are widespread on the buccal mucosa. The same lesions are also present in the pharynx, oesophagus, and on mucus-producing epithelia of the gut, from abomasum to rectum. Zebra-striped lesions on coecum and colon are said to be typical in some cases. Rarely, petechiae are also on the rumen mucosa.

=== Microscopic lesions ===
Microscopic study of both natural and experimental cases revealed congestion and edema of the lungs, while in other cases, it revealed a network of fibrin infiltrated with neutrophils, the formation of syncytia and giant cells, and the presence of a pink-colored bacterial colony. Infiltration of neutrophils and mononuclear cells was seen within the alveoli, bronchioles, alveolar wall, and interstitium of the lung. Microscopic analysis also revealed that interstitial pneumonia was followed by sloughing of the bronchial epithelium in the lungs and the prominence of type II pneumocytes. Numerous inflammatory cells were found in the submucosa and lamina propria of intestinal samples, and vacuolar degeneration and syncytial cells, which are microscopic features, were observed in hepatocytes of liver samples from goats. Periportal multifocal lymphocytic infiltrations were common in the liver parenchyma.

Leptomeningitis and nonsuppurative encephalitis were visible in brain sections under a microscope, and these conditions were characterized by vascular congestion, hemorrhages in the parenchyma, perivascular cuffing with mild to moderate mononuclear cells (mostly lymphocytes and few macrophages), focal to diffuse microgliosis, neuronal degeneration, satellitosis, and neuronophagia.

In summary, epithelial cells, alveolar macrophages, lungs, and hepatocytes all showed histopathological alterations, primarily infiltrations of inflammatory cells, syncytia, and presence of intranuclear and/or intracytoplasmic eosinophillic inclusions.

== Diagnosis ==
History and clinical signs enable a presumptive diagnosis to be made in endemic regions. The virus can be detected in acute cases from various swabs and blood samples, using polymerase chain reaction and ELISA. Antibodies can also be detected by ELISA.

== Treatment and control ==
Antibiotics such as chloramphenicol, penicillin, and streptomycin can be used and supportive treatment may be helpful. Additionally, a vaccine has been developed that may decrease death in the flock. Movement restrictions and slaughter of affected flocks may be required in an attempt to eradicate the disease. A global eradication programme has been developed by the Food and Agriculture Organization of the United Nations and the World Organisation for Animal Health. More information can be found on FAO's website on the implementation of this global plan. It is considered feasible to eradicate ovine rinderpest in 15 years, starting in the year 2016.
