= John Dalrymple Edgar Holmes =

British veterinary bacteriologist (1867–1915)

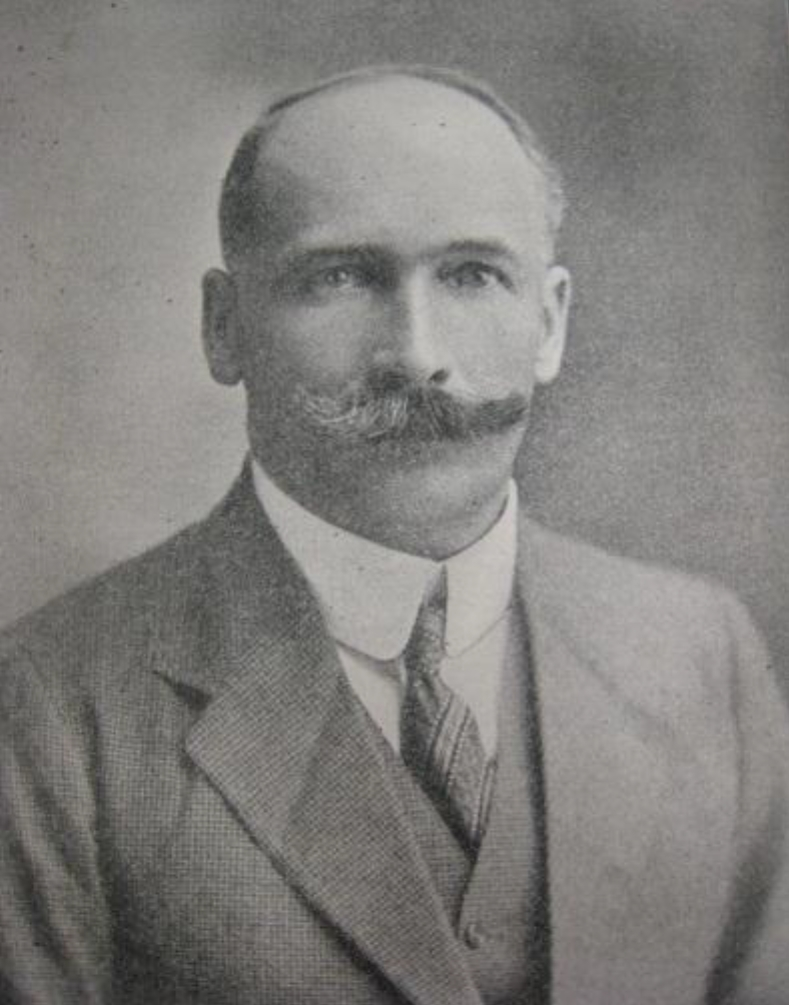

Lt. Col. John Dalrymple Edgar Holmes (1867 – 2 March 1915) was a British veterinary scientist and bacteriologist who worked in India as Imperial Bacteriologist. He worked on the production of veterinary vaccines especially for rinderpest.

Holmes was born in 1867 to Reverend John Holmes at Tipperary, where he went to the local grammar school before going to Trinity College, Dublin. Graduating with a BA in 1890 he joined the Royal Veterinary College and qualified MRCVS in 1895 and joined the Army Veterinary Department. He was deputed to the Indian Civil Veterinary Department in 1900 and worked as an Assistant Bacteriologist at the Muktesar Laboratory. He went to Cambridge for studies and received a DSc in 1905 followed by work at the Pasteur Institute in Paris. He returned to India and served as a Professor of Sanitary Science at the Punjab Veterinary College in Lahore. He was appointed Imperial Bacteriologist in 1907 to succeed Alfred Lingard. In 1912 he was awarded the Steele Memorial Medal for his work in veterinary medicine. In 1913 he was made Companion of the Order of the Indian Empire. His work in India included major studies on rinderpest.

Holmes' writings included Veterinary Pharmacopoeia of Bazaar Drugs and Description of the Muktesar Laboratory and its Work. He died of a cerebral haemorrhage at Bareilly. He is commemorated at the Royal College of Veterinary Surgeons Memorial in Belgravia House, London.
