= Lance Barrett-Lennard =

Canadian marine biologist

- Education: B.Sc., (1980) University of Guelph M.Sc., (1992) Ph.D., (2000) University of British Columbia
- Organization: Raincoast Conservation Foundation
- Known for: Killer whale population ecology, Marine Mammal Research Program, B.C. Cetacean Sightings Network,
- Website: https://www.raincoast.org/team/lance-barrett-lennard/

Lance Barrett-Lennard is a Canadian biologist specializing in the behavioural ecology and population biology of killer whales. A molecular geneticist, Barrett-Lennard uses DNA analysis to study the dispersal, mating habits, and group structure of killer whale sub-populations in the Pacific Northwest. He is best known for his research concerning the conservation of the Southern Resident killer whale sub-population. As of 2022, he is a Senior Scientist in the Cetacean Conservation Research Program at the Raincoast Conservation Foundation.

== Education ==
Lance Barrett-Lennard attained a Bachelor of Science in biology from the University of Guelph in Ontario (1976-1980), and went on to complete a Master of Science in biology at the University of British Columbia (1992). Barrett-Lennard also gained his doctorate at the University of British Columbia where he studied the role of genetics in the mating systems and population subdivisions of killer whales.

== Career ==
Following the completion of his Ph.D., Barrett-Lennard took a research scientist position with Fisheries and Oceans Canada (formerly DFO) at the Pacific Biological Station in Nanaimo, British Columbia where he continued studying the role of genetics in the population structure of killer whale sub-populations. In 2001, he accepted a position as Director of the Marine Mammal Research Program at the Vancouver Aquarium.

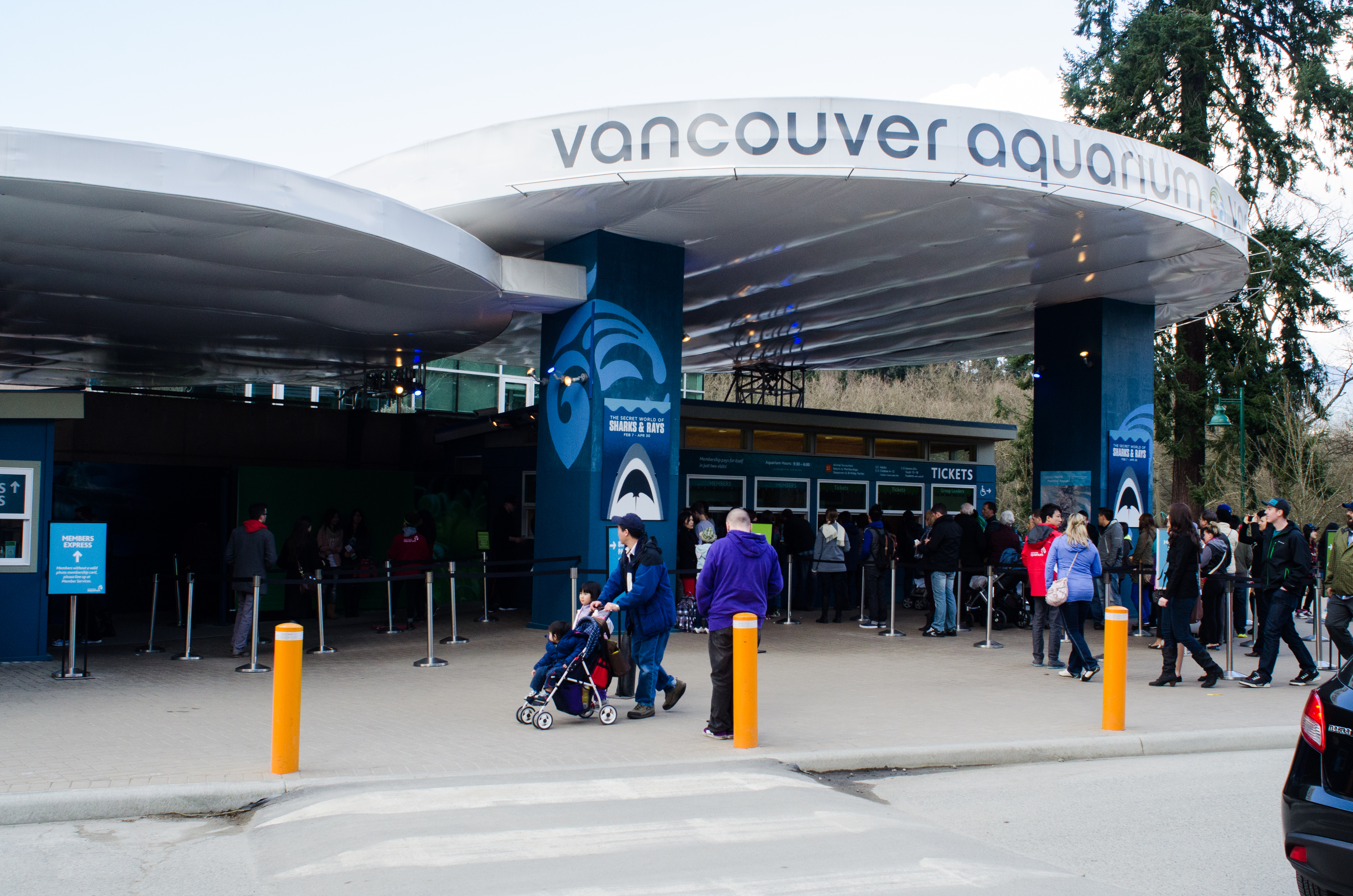
The Vancouver Aquarium.

== Research ==
One of many research units at the Vancouver Aquarium, the Marine Mammal Research Program (MMRP) conducts research on Killer Whales, Humpback Whales, Harbour Porpoises, Beluga Whales, Sea Otters, and a host of other marine mammals. A major branch of the MMRP is The B.C. Cetacean Sightings Network, a whale sightings report system that relies heavily on Citizen science. The B.C. Cetacean Sightings Network facilitates the reporting of whale sightings through the WhaleReport mobile app. Details on whale locations are then used by the WhaleReport Alert System to notify nearby vessels of cetaceans in their vicinity and to encourage them to take precautionary or evasive action. Data from the B.C. Cetacean Sightings Network is also used to encourage the practice of land-based whale watching. In 2015, the B.C. Cetacean Sightings Network partnered with the Whale Trail, a Seattle-based organization dedicated on identifying potential land-based whale watching sites in the Pacific Northwest. Land-based whale watching is viewed as a zero-impact alternative to traditional boat-based whale watching. As of recent, the WhaleTrail B.C. has identified 39 such sites. In addition, sightings data is available to academic researchers, industry, and NGOs to aid conservation-based research projects. Discoveries involving sightings data include a newly discovered hot spot of Pacific white-sided dolphin in the Howe Sound area in 2010, and the discovery of a feeding ground utilized by Gray whales in Baynes Sound.

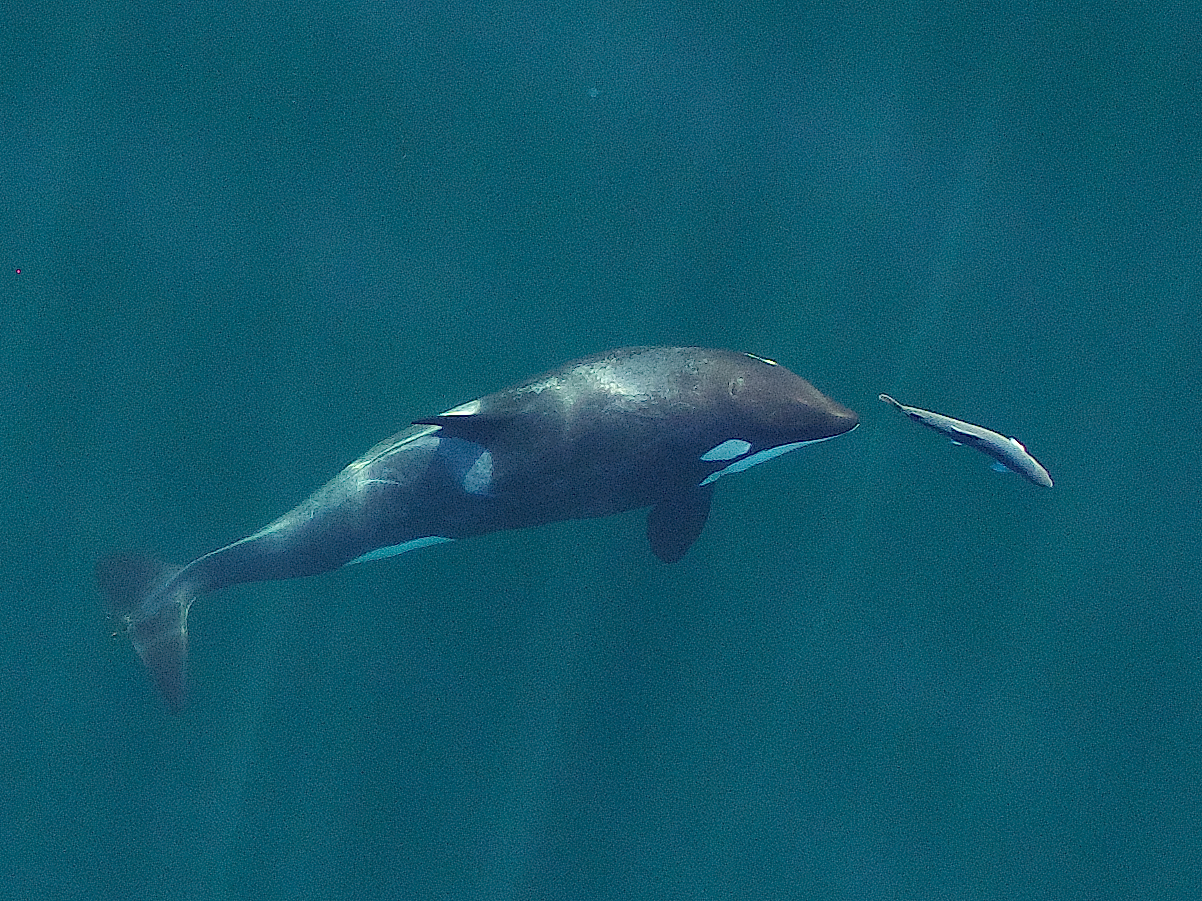
Drone-captured photo of Southern Resident Killer Whale chasing a Chinook Salmon. (2017)

Barrett-Lennard has made significant research contributions relating to the conservation of killer whales. Through DNA analysis, Barrett-Lennard and his colleagues have shown that the killer whale population in the northeastern Pacific ocean is divided into at least nine sympatric sub-populations. His research focuses on evidence of sympatric speciation in killer whale subpopulations inhabiting the northeastern Pacific. His work has shown that killer whale sub-populations vary significantly in their diet, behaviour, and feeding grounds. His work has unveiled wide variability in the diet of killer whale sub-populations. Barrett-Lennard's most cited study showed that the Southern resident killer whale is primarily piscivorous, and 96% of its diet is salmonids. The same study also discovered a distinct preference for mammalian prey by the Southern Transient Killer Whale sub-population. He has also shown that offshore killer whales may prey on Pacific sleeper shark, the first identified observation of the species being targeted as prey. In 2008, Barrett-Lennard's research was used by the Committee on the Status of Endangered Wildlife to officially list the Southern Resident Killer Whale as an endangered species

Barrett-Lennard's most recent work focuses on the use of drone-based aerial photogrammetry to remotely observe health and body condition of killer whales. His team has shown that images captured by drones can be used to estimate blubber fat reserves and subsequently body condition by analyzing features such as head shape and eyepatch proportions. Barrett-Lennard has also used drones to remotely monitor the respiratory microbiome of killer whales by aerially capturing samples of exhaled breath or "blow"

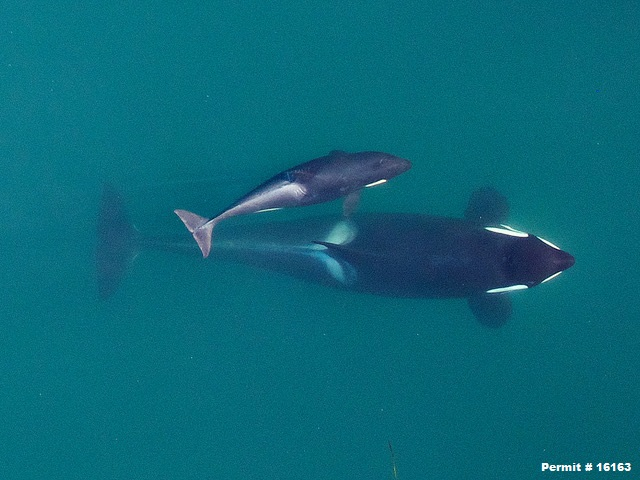
Drone-captured photo of two Southern Resident Killer Whales. (2015)

== Outreach ==
Barrett-Lennard has been a featured speaker at the annual B.C Marine Mammal Symposium in Vancouver, British Columbia. Barrett-Lennard has also shared his research with CBC News and CTV News. He has also voiced his scientific opinion on the controversial Harbor seal cull and the Trans Mountain Pipeline. Barrett-Lennard is arguably most well known for documenting the link between the decline of Chinook salmon in the Pacific Northwest and the endangered status of the southern resident killer whale through aerial images of starving individuals

== Selected publications ==
9. Barrett-Lennard, L.G. 2000. Population structure and mating patterns of killer whales (Orcinus orca) as revealed by DNA analysis. Retrieved from Population structure and mating patterns of Killer Whales (Orcinus orca) as revealed by DNA analysis

10. Saulitis, E., Matkin, C., Barrett-Lennard., L.G., Heise, K., and Ellis, G. 2006. Foraging strategies of sympatric killer whale (Orcinus orca) populations in Prince William Sound, Alaska. Marine Mammal Science 16(1): 94-109.

11. Barrett-Lennard, L.G., Ford, J.K.B, and Heise, K.A. 1996. The mixed blessing of echolocation: differences in the sonar use of fish-eating and mammal-eating killer whales. Animal Behaviour 51(3): 553-565

12. Khran, M.M., Herman, D.P., Matkin, C.O., Durban, J.W., Barrett-Lennard, L.G., Burrows, D.G., Dahlheim, M.G., Black, N., LeDuc, R.G., and Wade, P.R. 2007. Use of chemical tracers in assessing the diet and foraging regions of eastern North Pacific killer whales. Marine Environmental Research 63(2): 91-114.

13. Ford, J.K.B., Ellis, G.M., Barrett-Lennard, L.G., Morton, A.B., Palm, R.S., and Balcomb III, K.C. 1996. Dietary specialization in two sympatric populations of killer whales (Orcinus orca) in coastal British Columbia and adjacent waters. Canadian Journal of Zoology 76(8): 1456-1471

16. Fearnbach, H., Durban, J.W., Barrett-Lennard, L.G., Ellifrit, D.K., and Balcomb III, K.C. 2019. Evaluating the power of photogrammetry for monitoring killer whale body condition. Marine Mammal Science In Press.
