= Imperial Bacteriologist =

Imperial Bacteriologist and Imperial Agricultural Bacteriologist were designations in the British Indian government. The positions involved work related to aspects of applied bacteriology. The position in agriculture, first occupied by C.J. Bergtheil, involved problems relating to fermentation and chemistry in the production of indigo. On the veterinary side, Imperial bacteriologists worked on veterinary health with the stated terms of reference being to investigate disease of domesticated animals in all provinces in India and to ascertain, as far as possible, by biological research both in the laboratory and, when necessary, at the place of the outbreak, the means for preventing and curing such disease. The position was held by:

Veterinary

- 1890-1907 - Alfred Lingard (1849-1938), worked on vaccines, particularly rinderpest, initially at Pune and then at the Imperial Bacteriological Laboratory in Mukteswar
- 1907-1915 - Lt. Col. J.D.E. Holmes (1867-1915)
- 1916-1920 - Alfred Leslie Sheather

Agricultural

- 1902-1912 - Cyril J. Bergtheil (1878–1973), worked on the chemistry of indigo production in Sirsiya, Bihar
- 1909-1926 - Claud Mackenzie Hutchinson (1869-1941)

The position was later changed to Director of the Imperial Veterinary Research Institute.
