= Cyril J. Bergtheil =

English chemist, bacteriologist, and zoologist (1878–1973)

Cyril Jonas Bergtheil (2 December 1878 – 25 August 1973), known from around 1916 as Cyril Jonas Berkeley, was an English chemist, bacteriologist, and zoologist of German ancestry. He worked in India from 1902 to 1912 serving as an Imperial Bacteriologist and later collaborated with his wife Edith Berkeley in studies on polychaetes.

== Early life ==
Cyril was born in London, the son of Louis Michael Bergtheil and Alice Maud. When he was very young, his parents were divorced, and his mother married again. It was his step-father Alfred James Puttick who introduced him to science through scientific periodicals and visits to lectures at the Royal Institution. He studied at St. Paul's school from 1891 to 1895 and moved to Nuremberg, where he learnt German and studied chemistry at the Industrieschule.

== Work ==
=== 1987–1903 ===
Cyril went to University College London and worked in William Ramsay's laboratory from 1897 to 1899 alongside others like Morris Travers. From 1899 to 1901 he researched agricultural chemistry and bacteriology at the Agricultural College, Wye. While in Ramsay's lab he met Edith Dunington in 1898. He went to India to work for the British Indigo Planter's Association. As artificial indigo made indigo farming obsolete in India, he was recognized for his work by the government and they sought to retain him for the newly proposed agricultural research institute at Pusa. In 1902, Bergtheil was appointed bacteriologist in the Agriculture Department of India. He married Edith on February 26, 1902, and they sailed for Bombay the next day. His initial work was to study the manufacture of indigo under chemist Christopher Rawson with the aim to compete with Germany and their synthetic indigo dyes. He worked for eleven years, mostly at the Sirsia indigo research station, Muzaffarpur. The work included attempts to improve the efficiency of extraction of the indigo. They had a daughter, Alfreda Alice, on March 3, 1903. She was sent to live with her maternal grandmother in England due to her poor health and she later became a zoologist.

=== 1904–1964 ===
Bergtheil collaborated with other scientists in India, joining I. H. Burkill along the Hooker trail in the eastern Himalayas during which he became interested in the distribution of earthworms. He collected across altitude gradients and worked on these specimens with Wilhelm Michaelsen, who named a species Megascolides bergtheili after him. The family changed from their German-Jewish surname around 1916 to Berkeley due to the World War and public suspicion around those with German names or connections. Berkeley began to work on polychaetes in collaboration with his wife. Around 1916–17 he taught bacteriology at the University of British Columbia while his wife taught zoology. They visited the Nanaimo field station in 1917. Berkeley also worked on acetone production from kelp for Hercules Powder Company in San Diego. In 1919 the family moved to live in Nanaimo and Cyril worked as an assistant curator at the station. Together the Berkeleys authored nearly 34 papers between 1932 and 1964.
