= Edith Berkeley =

Canadian marine biologist (1875–1963)

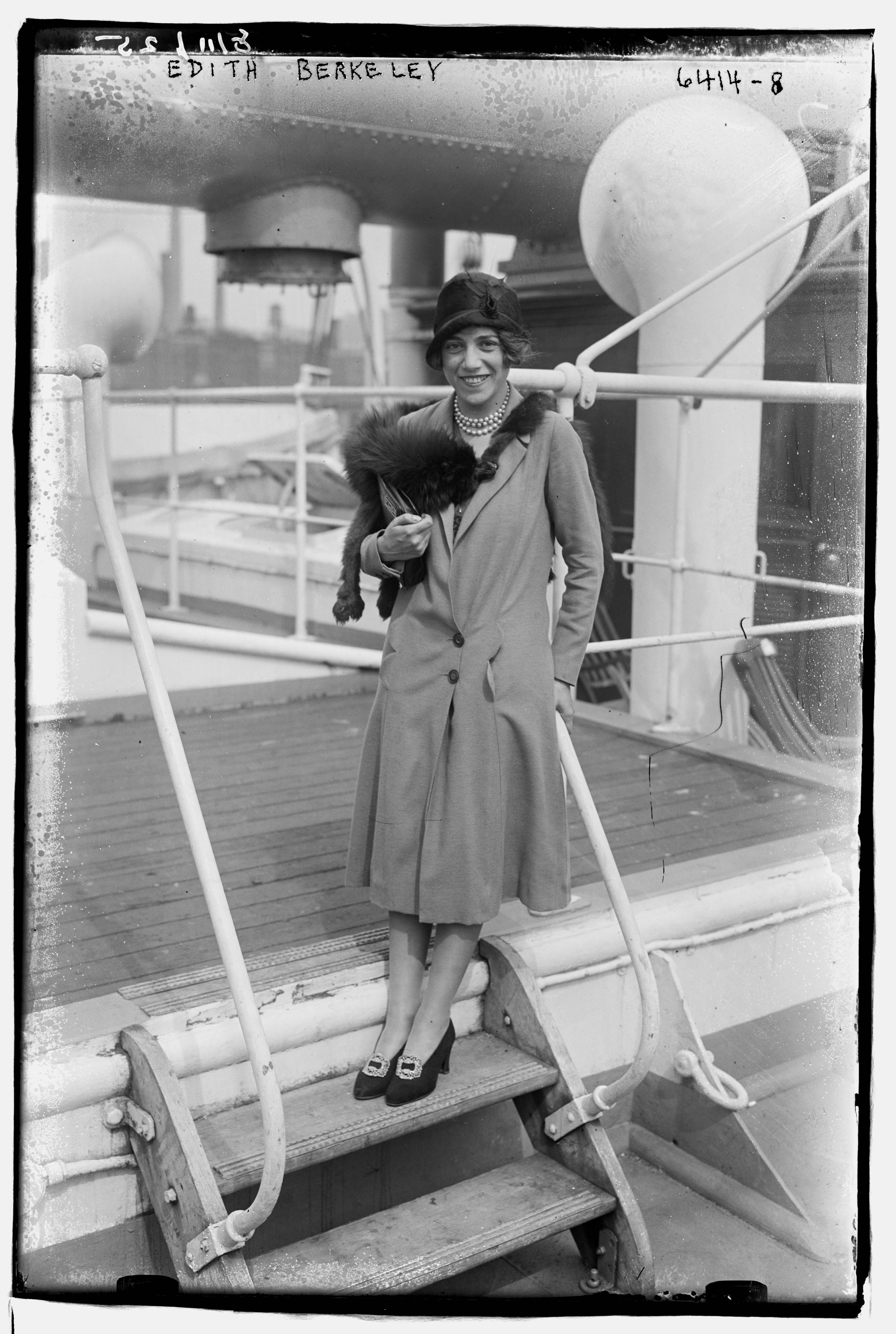
- Berkeley in 1925
- Born: Edith Dunington; 1 September 1875; Tulbagh, Cape Colony
- Died: 25 February 1963 (aged 87); Nanaimo, British Columbia
- Occupation: Marine biologist
- Known for: The biology of polychaetes

Edith Berkeley (née Dunington; 1 September 1875 – 25 February 1963) was a Canadian marine biologist who specialized in the biology of polychaetes. The Edith Berkeley Memorial Lectures were established in the University of British Columbia in her memory in 1969.

== Early life and education ==
Berkeley was born Edith Dunington in Tulbagh, Cape Colony on 1 September 1875. Her parents were bridge engineer Alfred Dunington and his wife Martha Treglohan. Berkeley studied at Wimbledon High School in London, UK, and completed a pre-medical course at the University of London while attending on scholarship.

== Research and career ==
After earning her bachelor of medicine degree in 1897, Edith took an interest in chemistry and zoology. She worked for a Professor Weldon as well as Morris Travers in the William Ramsay Laboratory.

In 1918, she gave up a paid position as zoology assistant at Columbia University to work as a volunteer for the Pacific Biological Station at Nanaimo in British Columbia, Canada. Though she was never officially on staff, her research on polychaetes brought prestige to the Station and established her as a world authority on the subject.

== Personal life ==
Edith met her husband, Cyril J. Bergtheil, in the chemistry lab of Morris Travers as an undergraduate at London University. Bergtheil changed his name to Cyril J. Berkeley. In 1902, he was hired as an imperial bacteriologist in Bihar, India. Edith and Cyril married on February 26, 1902, and moved to India where they lived for ten years.

Cyril left his own research to help Edith study polychaete taxonomy by 1930. The pair wrote 34 papers together, and Edith published an additional 12 in her own name. Many organisms—including two rhododendron hybrids, two polychaetes (Lepidasthenia berkeleyae and Spiophanes berkeleyorum), and a species of earthworm—have been named after them. Their daughter Alfreda Berkeley Needler (1903–1951) also became a zoologist, as did Alfreda's daughter Mary Needler Arai (1932–2017). Edith died in Nanaimo, British Columbia, on February 25, 1963.

== Selected academic publications ==
- Polychaetous annelids from the Nanaimo district. Part 1. Syllidae to Sigalionidae. Contributions to Canadian Biology 1: 203-218, 1923.
- Polychaetous annelids from the Nanaimo district. Part 2. Phyllodocidae to Nereidae. Contributions to Canadian Biology 2: 285-293, 1924.
- On a new case of commensalism between echinoderm and annelid. Canadian Field Naturalist 38: 193, 1924.
- Polychaetous annelids from the Nanaimo district. Part 3. Leodicidae to Spionidae. Contributions to Canadian Biology 3: 405-422, 1927.
- A new genus of Chaetopteridae from the N.E. Pacific: With some remarks on allied genera. Proceedings of the Zoological Society Part 2: 441-445, 1927.
- Polychaetous annelids from the Nanaimo district. Part 4. Chaetopteridae to Maldanidae. Contributions to Canadian Biology 4: 305-316, 1929.
- Polychaetous annelids from the Nanaimo district. Part 5. Ammocharidae to Myzostomidae, with an appendix on some pelagic forms from the Strait of Georgia and the west coast of Vancouver Island. Contributions to Canadian Biology 6: 65-77, 1930.
- Swarming of Odontosyllis phosphorea Moore, and of other Polychaeta near Nanaimo, B.C. Nature 136(3452): 1029, 1935.
- Plankton of the Bermuda oceanographic expeditions, 3: Notes on Polychaeta. Zoologica 21: 85-87, 1936.
- Occurrence of Saccociryus in western Canada. Nature 137(3478) : 1075, 1936.
- Morphological characters of Myriochele heeri Malmgren. Nature 164(4162): 239, 1949.
- Swarming of the polychaete Odontosyllis phosphorea Moore, var. nanaimoerzsis Berkeley, near Nanaimo, B.C. Nature 191(4795): 1321, 1961.
