= Severus Sanctus Endelechius =

Severus Sanctus Endelechius (or Endelechus) was a 4th century poet and rhetorician, and the writer of De Mortibus Boum (or Bovum), i.e. On the Deaths of Cattle.

It is a poem belonging to the classical bucolic tradition, but also concerned with Christian apologetics. It mentions a cattle plague, which has been identified as rinderpest. Another title is Carmen bucolicum de virtute signi crucis domini.

He has been identified with a rhetorician Severus who was a friend of Paulinus of Nola known as Severus Rhetor. He probably lived towards the end of the 4th century.
