= Alfred Lingard =

British pathologist (1849–1938)

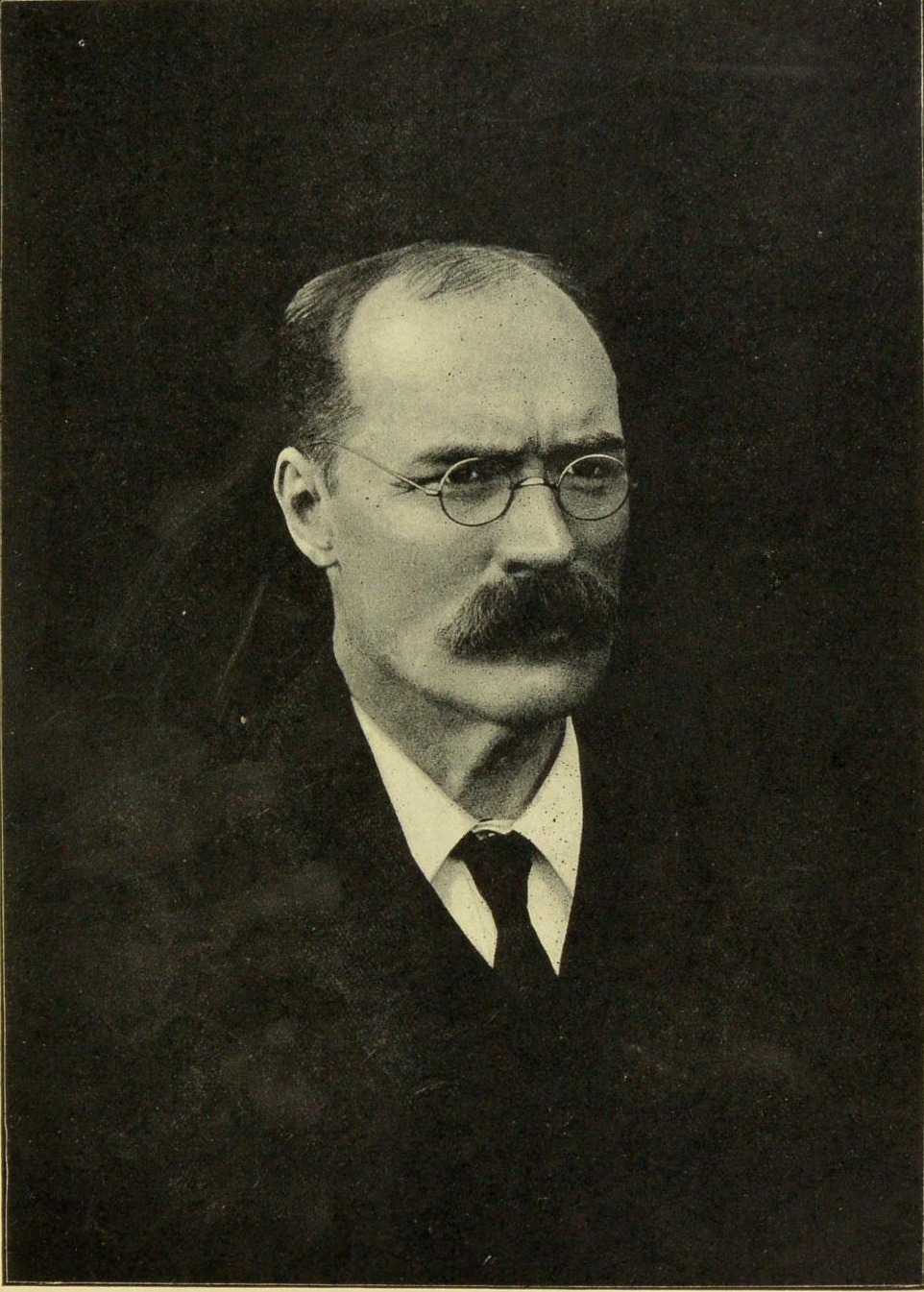

Alfred Lingard (1849 – 18 February 1938) was a British medical pathologist who worked on veterinary diseases in India, serving as an Imperial Bacteriologist from 1890 to 1907. He was the founding director of the Imperial Bacteriological Laboratory in Mukteswar (which later became part of the Indian Veterinary Research Institute) to produce anthrax and rinderpest vaccines.

== Life and work ==
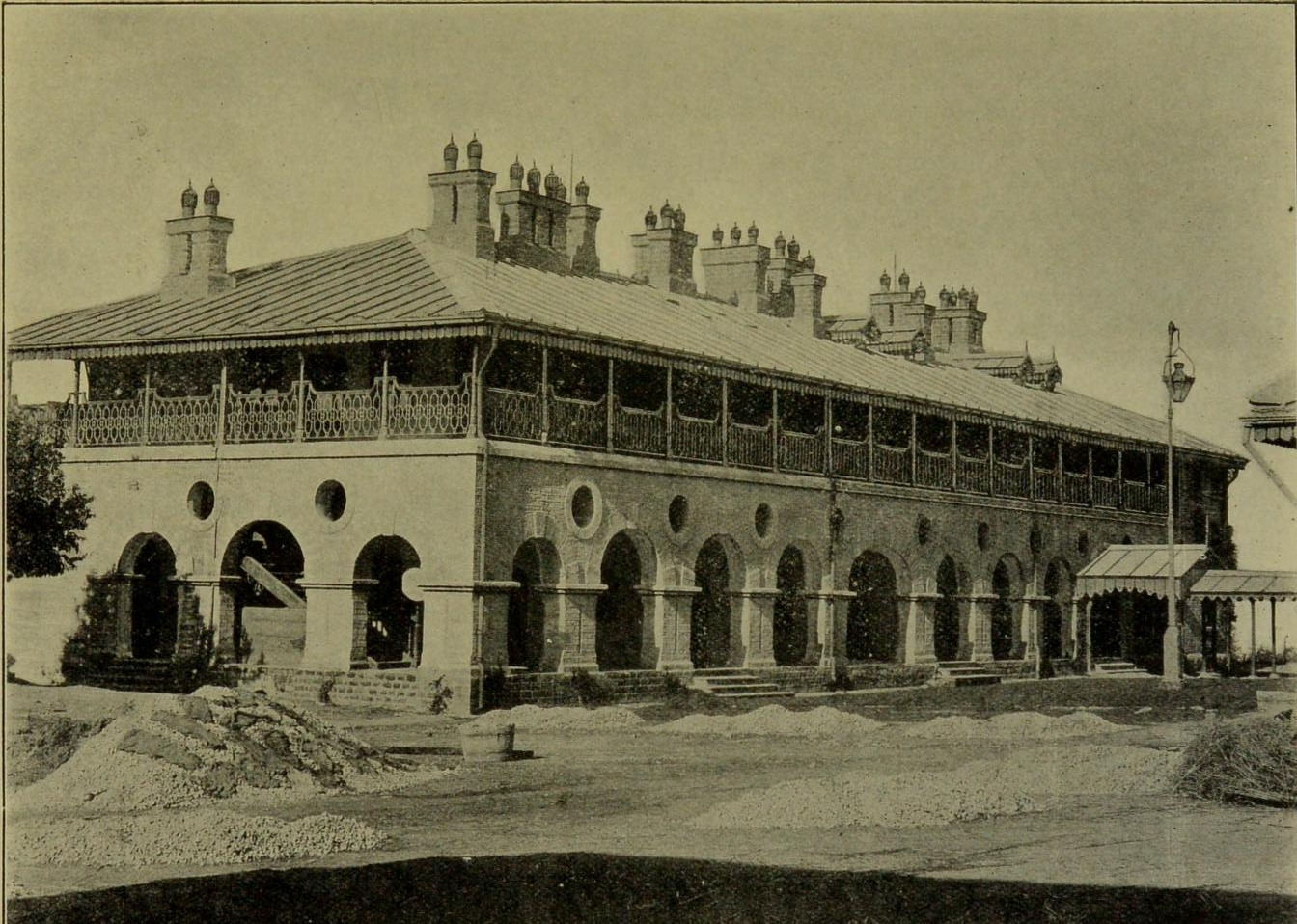
The Imperial Bacteriological Laboratory in Mukteshwar, c. 1913

Lingard received a medical degree in 1873, an LSA in 1874. He worked in the Royal Army Medical Corps and as a house physician at St. Thomas' Hospital before traveling across Europe. Lingard studied bacteriology in Germany and had worked as a lecturer at the Birkbeck Institution. He was appointed as Imperial Bacteriologist from 1890 to 1907. The post was created following several earlier studies. A report commissioned by Lord Mayo in 1871 had identified that "Rinderpest is the murrain to which a far greater share of mortality among cattle is due than all other causes put together and this would appear to be still true at the present time" and the Pioneer reported in 1893 that rinderpest caused a loss of three crore rupees in bad years. In 1915 there were 1,10,397 bovines and 1,232 sheep reported killed by rinderpest. Lingard was initially located at Poona near the College of Science but he suggested the establishment of a laboratory in Mukteswar, which happened in 1893. The hot climate was noted as being unsuitable for the storage of serum and vaccines and a location in the mountains was claimed to be more suitable. The isolation from local cattle was also thought to make it safer for research on infectious diseases. On his recommendation, the lab was visited by Robert Koch, George Gaffky, and Pfeiffer. His early work was on Surra disease of horses. Surra was a form of trypanosomiasis and among Lingard's experiments were (unsuccessful) trials of Fowler's solution (Arsphenamine). After the move to Mukteswar the main work was the search for a rinderpest vaccine. The work began in 1897. The original laboratory was burnt and destroyed in a fire on 27 September 1899.

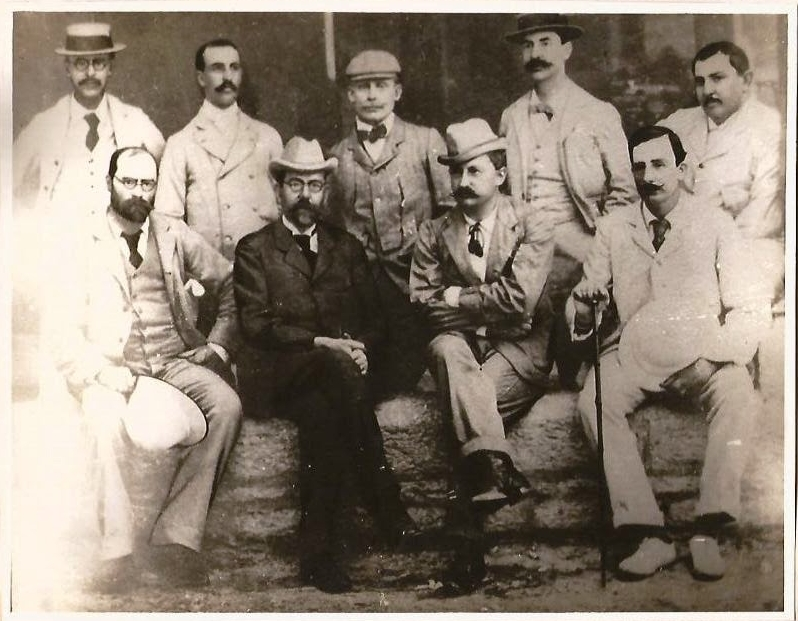
Lingard (seated at left) with Koch, Pfeiffer, and Gaffky. 1897, Mukteshwar.

Apart from writing on bacteriology, Lingard also translated many works from French to English. Lingard was a Fellow of the Royal Microscopical Society, a member of the Pathological Society of London, the British Medical Association, the Anthropological Institute of Great Britain and Ireland and the Society for Anthropology, Paris. He was also enlisted in the Middlesex Rifle Volunteers. As an animal physiologist, he held a license for vivisection and during the period when the anti-vivisection movement was at its peak, he was included as a target. A booklet noted that he had a "License for Vivisection in a building belonging to Mr. George Lacey, 213, Wandsworth Road, S.W., and situated in the Stag Yard, opposite side of the Wandsworth Road to the above address in 1883. Certificate dispensing with obligation to kill. No experiments returned 1883." Another activist who opposed "Loathsome Feeding" noted that "Dr. Klein and Mr. A. Lingard actually fed fowls upon the putrid lungs of human beings, to see if it were possible thus to communicate to them the consumption of which the human patients died."

J.D.E. Holmes succeeded him as Imperial Bacteriologist in 1907.
