= Pacific Biological Station =

Canadian research station

Coordinates: 49.211339°N 123.954607°W

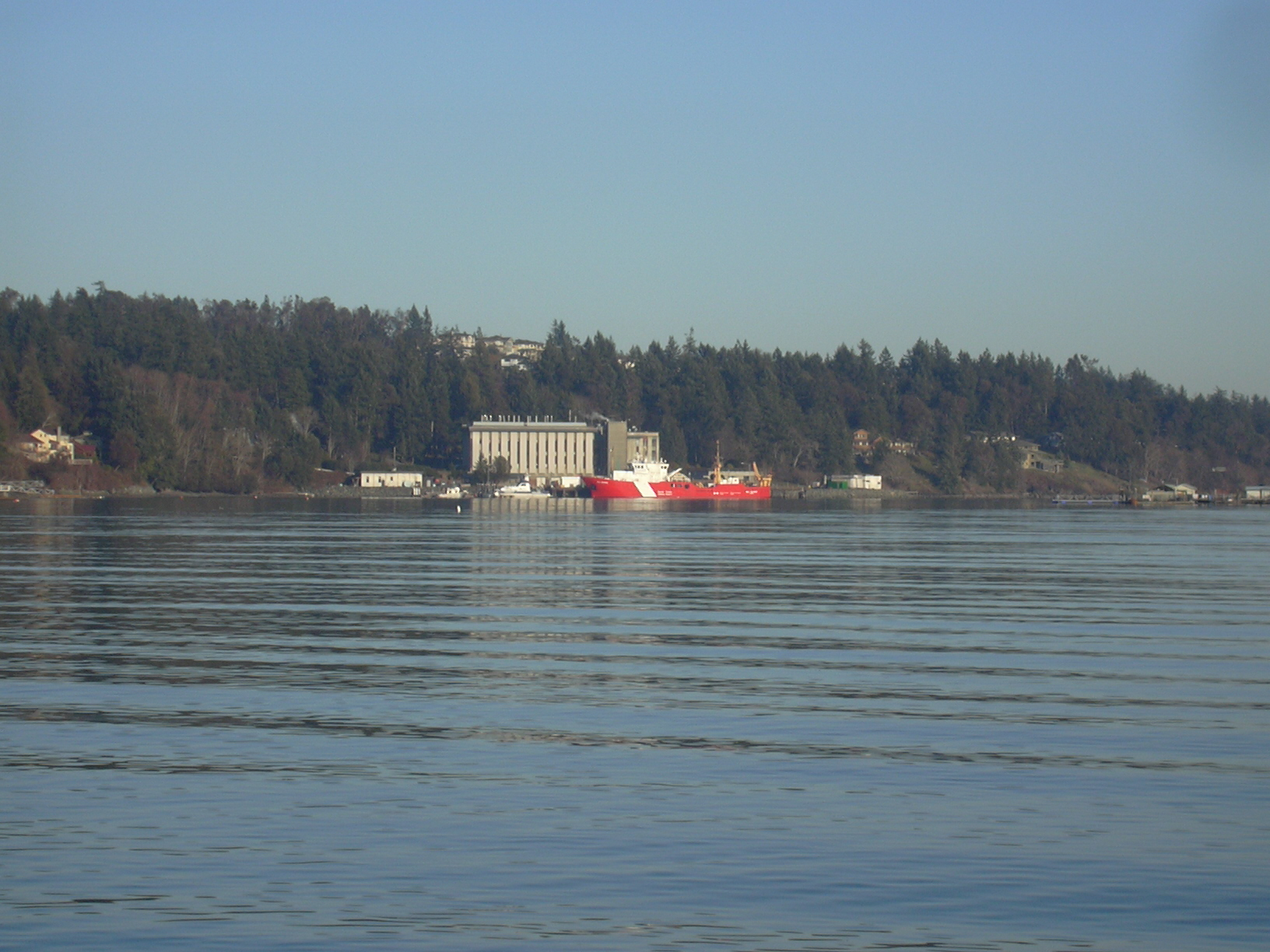
View of the Pacific Biological Station from Departure Bay Beach (c. 2003)

The Pacific Biological Station (acronym: PBS) is a Research station in Departure Bay, Nanaimo, British Columbia, Canada. Established in 1908 (118 years ago), with the Rev. George William Taylor as its first director and sole employee, it is the oldest fisheries research centre on the Pacific coast. Operated by Fisheries and Oceans Canada, the station forms a network with eight other scientific facilities.

Together with the St. Andrew's Biological Station in New Brunswick, the Pacific Biological Station was designated a National Historic Event in 2011.

== Research ==
Its research facilities include the research vessel CCGS W. E. Ricker and an experimental fish farm. Key research areas are stock assessment, aquaculture, marine environment, habitat science, ocean science, and productivity. Ongoing elasmobranch research at the PBS includes basking sharks, skate tagging, Pacific spiny dogfish, blue shark tagging, and development of ageing methods.

Since 1984, station researchers store their findings in the GFCATCH database, which holds a record of all specimens removed from fisheries for study. This system was later altered in 1991 to record trawl trips and other cruising information. GFCATCH has also added records of the station's cruising and trawling activities and shipping patterns since 1954. This data is gathered from both official ship's logs and first-hand accounts from the crews and fishery scientists that attended those voyages. The database also keeps a catalogue of the species that were studied on each expedition, ranging from sea sponges and jellyfish to various arthropods, like shrimp. The list also categorizes various worm species, such as leeches and other annelids.

== History ==
The station conducts research expeditions and trawling missions along Canada's west coast, with expeditions to the Strait of Georgia, Queen Charlotte Sound, and the Hecate Strait.

The Pacific Biological Station is one of 12 locations part of the British Columbia Shore Station Oceanographic Program, collecting coastal water temperature and salinity measurements from Departure Bay every day since 1914.

Between 1944 and 2002, the Fisheries and Oceans Canada launched 652 research cruises from the station. These cruises allowed researchers direct access to the fisheries where they investigated various aquatic animals and their ecologies. One prominent species in the station's research has been the groundfish. These research cruises are all catalogued using an online database, GFCruise.

The vessels chartered for these voyages included Investigator #1, which operated from January 1948 to November 1964. Other vessels included the AP Knight, G.B. Reed, Ocean Traveller, Gambler 1, Star Wars II, and Rupert Brand V.

Scientists and researchers from many backgrounds worked at the station during its long tenure. These researchers included freshwater biologist Ferris Neave, who worked at the station from 1939 until he retired in 1966. Richard J. Beamish, a Canadian fisheries scientist, served as a groundfish researcher and later director of the station from 1980 to 1993. Statisticians also collaborate with the researchers to measure stock assessments and fishery management. John T. Schnute, a mathematician from Texas State University, worked at the station for 28 years.

The station celebrated its 100th year of research in 2008. The centennial celebration included guest lecturers Mark Angelo and Rick Troll and attracted 20,000 visitors from multiple research fields. The celebration also included guided tours of the station's facilities, including a library and circulating sea water containers to store specimens.

== Scientific discoveries ==
A report from the Canadian Chemistry and Metallurgy journal found early studies from the station neglected to account for chemical factors in the fisheries they were observing. The study included the oxygen content of a specimen's habitat and the materials that make up the ocean sediment where many roundworms live.

Studies headed by Richard Beamish discovered new techniques for determining the ages of fish. This discovery has altered the way many fisheries monitor their stocks to prevent themselves from over-harvesting. The study also found the Pacific ocean perch could live up to 100 years.

Station fishery research has also contributed to mathematical studies to improve management of major Pacific fisheries. These studies also provided possible alternatives to existing fishery models and offer greater insight into the relationship between fishery activities and the Pacific environment.

== See also ==
- Edith Berkeley
