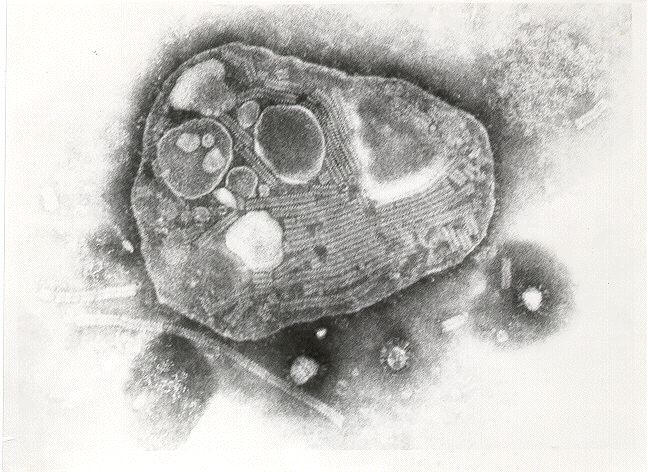

Virus classification
- (unranked): Virus
- Realm: Riboviria
- Kingdom: Orthornavirae
- Phylum: Negarnaviricota
- Class: Monjiviricetes
- Order: Mononegavirales
- Family: Paramyxoviridae
- Genus: Morbillivirus
- Species: †Morbillivirus pecoris

Synonyms
- Rinderpest virus; Rinderpest morbillivirus

= Rinderpest =

†Morbillivirus pecoris

Eradicated morbillivirus disease

Rinderpest (also cattle plague or steppe murrain) was an infectious viral disease of cattle, domestic water buffalo, and many other species of even-toed ungulates, including gaurs, buffalo, bison, antelope, deer, giraffes, wildebeests, and warthogs. The disease was characterized by fever, oral erosions, diarrhea, lymphoid necrosis, and high mortality. Death rates during outbreaks were usually extremely high, approaching 100% in immunologically naïve populations. Rinderpest was mainly transmitted by direct contact and by drinking contaminated water, although it could also be transmitted by air.

Rinderpest is believed to have originated in Asia, and to have spread by transport of cattle. The term Rinderpest (German: [ˈʁɪndɐpɛst]) is a German word meaning "cattle plague". Rinderpest virus (RPV) belongs to the genus Morbillivirus, alongside measles virus – its closest relative – and canine distemper virus. The measles virus may have diverged from rinderpest around the 6th century BC, coinciding with the first human settlements large enough to sustain endemic measles transmission. After a global eradication campaign that began in the mid-20th century, the last confirmed case of rinderpest was diagnosed in 2001. In 2010, the United Nations Food and Agriculture Organization (FAO) announced that field activities in the decades-long, worldwide campaign to eradicate the disease were ending, paving the way for a formal declaration in June 2011 of the global eradication of rinderpest. This makes it only the second disease in history to be fully wiped out, following smallpox.

== Virus ==
Rinderpest virus (RPV) is a member of the genus Morbillivirus, which also includes the measles and canine distemper viruses. Like other members of the Paramyxoviridae family, it produces enveloped virions and is a negative-sense single-stranded RNA virus. The virus is particularly fragile and is quickly inactivated by heat, desiccation, and sunlight.

Measles virus and rinderpest virus diverged from a common ancestor, most likely a cattle-infecting virus. Earlier molecular clocks estimates have been superseded by a 2020 study, which sequenced the genome of a 1912 measles virus recovered from a preserved lung specimen and revised the estimated time of divergence to the 6th century BC (mean 528 BC, with a 95% credible interval of 1174 BC to 165 CE), coinciding with the rise of large cities. The spillover to humans; and thus the emergence of measles; could have occurred at any point between this divergence and the most recent common ancestor of all known measles virus strains, estimated at 1880 CE.

== Disease and symptoms ==
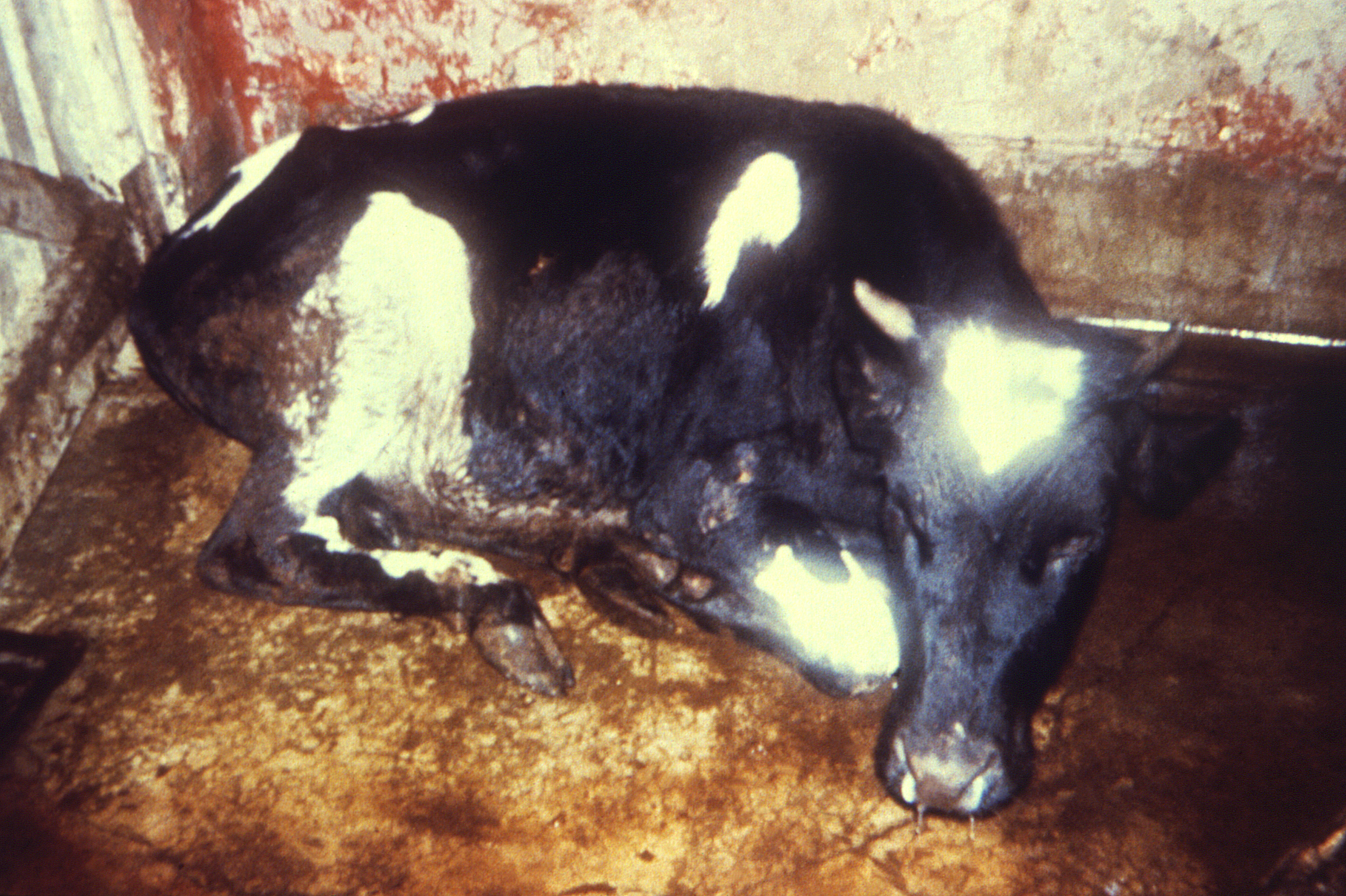
A cow with rinderpest in the "milk fever" position, 1982

Death rates during outbreaks were usually extremely high, approaching 100% in immunologically naïve populations. The disease was mainly spread by direct contact and by drinking contaminated water, although it could also be transmitted by air.

Initial symptoms include fever, loss of appetite, and nasal and eye discharges. Subsequently, irregular erosions appear in the mouth, the lining of the nose, and the genital tract. Acute diarrhea, preceded by constipation, is also a common feature. Most animals die 6–12 days after the onset of these clinical signs. The delayed appearance of these signs of illness account for the steady spread of the disease once a historical outbreak began; an animal infected by rinderpest undergoes an incubation period of 3–15 days. Signs of the disease only manifest at the end of that time. Cattle and wild ungulates typically die 8–12 days after signs of the disease emerge, by which time the animals may have travelled far from the place of infection and been mixed with many other animals.

== History and epizootics ==
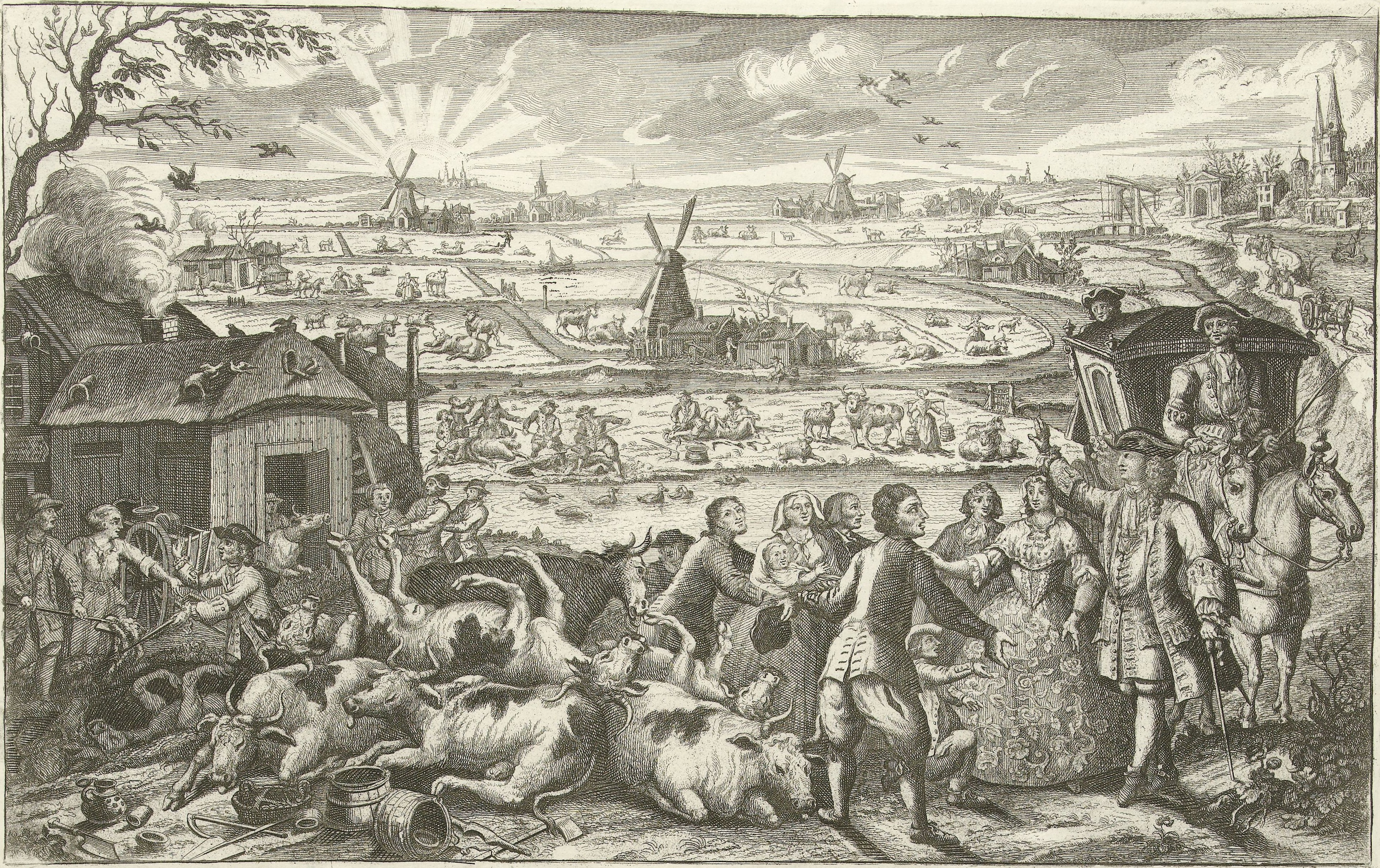
God's Punishment on the Netherlands through the Cattle Plague, 1745 by Jan Smit

=== Early history ===
The disease is believed to have originated in Asia, later spreading through the transport of cattle. Other cattle epizootics are noted in ancient times; a cattle plague is thought to be one of the 10 plagues of Egypt described in the Hebrew Bible. By around 3,000 BC, a cattle plague had reached Egypt, and rinderpest later spread throughout the remainder of Africa, following European colonization.

In the fourth century, Roman writer Severus Sanctus Endelechius described rinderpest in his book, On the Deaths of Cattle.

=== 18th century ===
Cattle plagues recurred throughout history, often accompanying wars and military campaigns. They hit Europe especially hard in the 18th century, with three long panzootics, which although varying in intensity and duration from region to region, took place in the periods of 1709–1720, 1742–1760, and 1768–1786. In the 18th century a deadly outbreak between 1769 and 1785 resulted in universal governmental action, but with somewhat divergent responses. The Dutch and the German principalities demanded quarantines and strict burial practices; England and large parts of Italy (the Papal States) saw slaughter of infected animals; in the Austrian Netherlands (Flanders), the response was inspection and precautionary slaughter coupled with compensation to the owners. No code of practice and no standard responses were used, but for a hundred years thereafter in German-speaking countries, the focus on the problem of rinderpest was less intense.

==== Inoculation ====
In the early 18th century, the disease was seen as similar to smallpox, due to its analogous symptoms. The personal physician of the pope, Giovanni Maria Lancisi, recommended the destruction of all infected and exposed animals. This policy was not very popular and was used only sparingly in the first part of the century. Later, it was used successfully in several countries, although it was sometimes seen as too costly or drastic, and depended on a strong central authority to be effective (which was notably lacking in the Dutch Republic). Because of these downsides, numerous attempts were made to inoculate animals against the disease. These attempts met with varying success, but the procedure was not widely used and was no longer practiced at all in 19th-century Western or Central Europe. Rinderpest was an immense problem, but inoculation was not a valid solution. In many cases, it caused too many losses. Even more importantly, it perpetuated the circulation of the virus in the cattle population. The pioneers of inoculation did contribute significantly to knowledge about infectious diseases. Their experiments confirmed the concepts of those who saw infectious diseases as caused by specific agents, and were the first to recognize maternally derived immunity.

==== Early English experimentation ====
The first written report of rinderpest inoculation was published in a letter signed "T.S." in the November 1754 issue of The Gentleman's Magazine, a widely read journal which also supported the progress of smallpox inoculation. This letter reported that a Mr Dobsen had inoculated his cattle and had thus preserved 9 out of 10 of them, although this was retracted in the next issue, as it was apparently a Sir William St. Quintin who had done the inoculating (this was done by placing bits of material previously dipped in morbid discharge into an incision made in the dewlap of the animal). These letters encouraged further application of inoculation in the fight against diseases. The first inoculation against measles was made three years after their publication.

From early 1755 onwards, experiments were taking place in the Netherlands, as well, results of which were also published in The Gentleman's Magazine. As in England, the disease was seen as analogous with smallpox. While these experiments were reasonably successful, they did not have a significant impact; the total number of inoculations in England appears to have been very limited, and after 1780, the English interest in inoculation disappeared almost entirely. Almost all further experimentation was done in the Netherlands, northern Germany and Denmark.

==== Further trials in the Netherlands ====
Due to a very severe outbreak at the end of the 1760s, some of the best-known names in Dutch medicine became involved in the struggle against the disease. Several independent trials were begun, most notably by Pieter Camper in Groningen and Friesland. The results of his experiment in Friesland were encouraging, but they proved to be the exception; testing by others in the provinces of Utrecht and Friesland obtained disastrous results. As a result, the Frisian authorities concluded in 1769 that the cause of rinderpest was God's displeasure with the sinful behavior of the Frisian people and proclaimed 15 November a day of fasting and prayer. Interest in inoculation declined sharply across the country.

In this climate of discouragement and scepticism, Geert Reinders, a farmer in the province of Groningen and a self-taught man, decided to continue the experiments. He collaborated with Wijnold Munniks, who had supervised earlier trials. They tried different inoculation procedures and a variety of treatments to lighten the symptoms, all of them without significant effect. Although they were not able to perfect the inoculation procedure, they did make some useful observations.

Reinders resumed his experiments in 1774, concentrating on the inoculation of calves from cows that had recovered from rinderpest. He was probably the first to make practical use of maternally derived immunity. The detailed results of his trials were published in 1776 and reprinted in 1777. His inoculation procedure did not differ much from what had been used previously, except for the use of three separate inoculations at an early age. This produced far better results, and the publication of his work renewed interest in inoculation. For the period of 1777 to 1781, 89% of inoculated animals survived, compared to a 29% survival rate after natural infection.

In the Netherlands, too, interest in rinderpest inoculation declined in the 1780s because the disease itself decreased in intensity.

==== In other countries ====
Apart from the Dutch Republic, the only other regions where inoculation was used to any significant level were northern Germany and Denmark. Experiments started in Mecklenburg during the epizootic of the late 1770s. "Insurance companies" were created which provided inoculation in special "institutes". Although these were private initiatives, they were created with full encouragement from the authorities. Though neighboring states followed this practice with interest, the practice never caught on outside Mecklenburg; many were still opposed to inoculation.

While some experimentation occurred in other countries (most extensively in Denmark), in the majority of European countries, the struggle against the disease was based on stamping it out. Sometimes, this could be done with minimal sacrifices; at other times, it required slaughter at a massive scale.

=== 19th century ===
Major outbreaks of cattle plague were documented from the mid-19th century onwards. Responses to these outbreaks differed across the world.

==== Rinderpest in 19th-century Europe ====
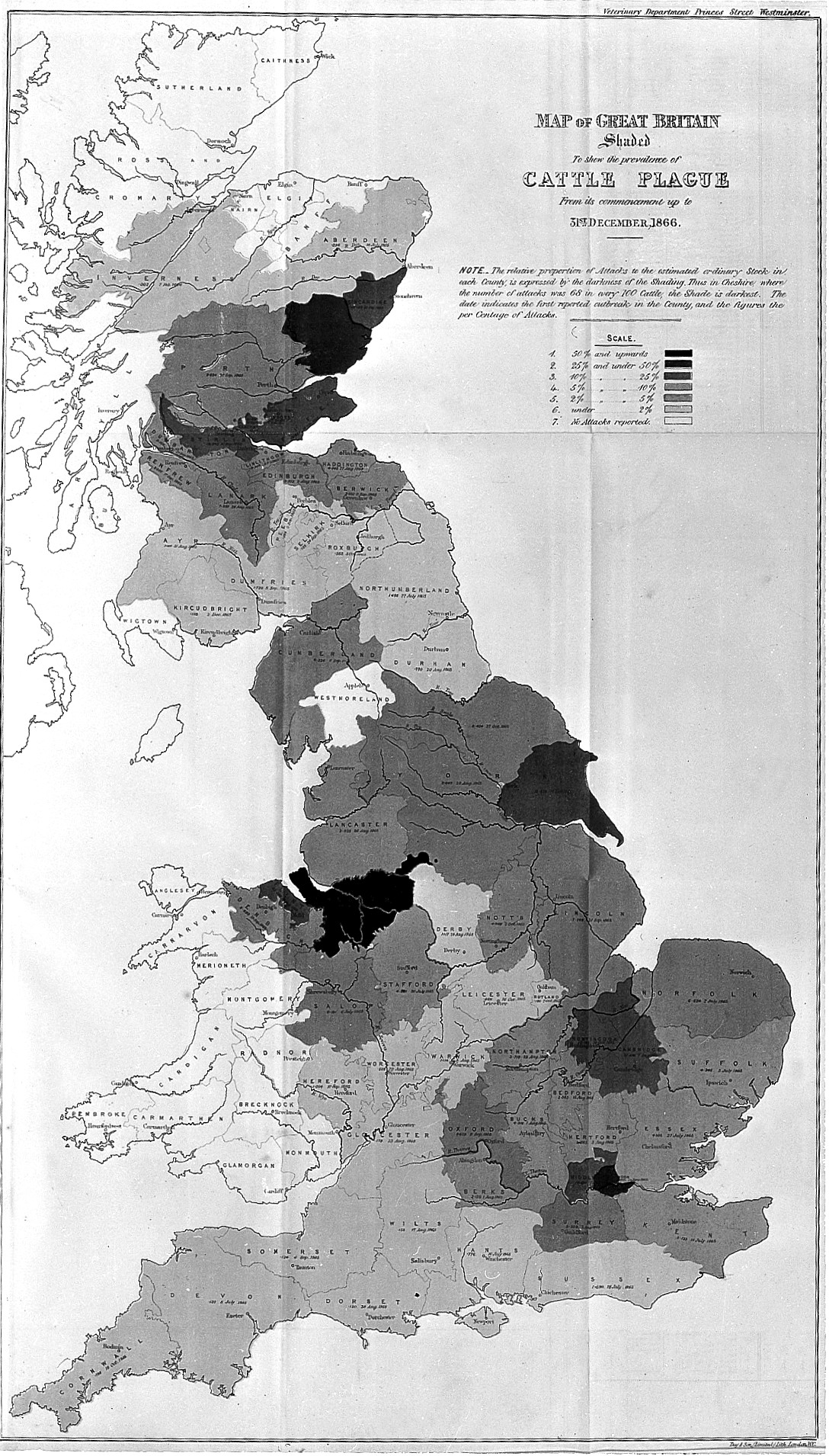
Veterinary report on the cattle plague, 1865–1867, Great Britain (Wellcome L0002361)

A major outbreak affected the whole of the British Isles for three years after 1865. In August 1865 an Order of the British Privy Council required the slaughter of rinderpest-affected cattle. By early May 1867, the overall slaughter total was around 75,000 cattle, which at that time had a value around £10 per head. Initially, £55,000 were granted (after a period of delay) to compensate farmers where they complied with the slaughter directive, but had no other source of compensation. In certain areas, such as Aberdeenshire and Norfolk, farmers had banded together to provide mutual assurance by creating a resource pool against the risk of rinderpest. Because the initial slaughter regimen was not backed by compensation, the presence of a voluntary mutual assurance scheme drove down the infection rates by guaranteeing payment for compliance with the government instruction. The Privy Council ordered a detailed investigation of the disaster, which reported in 1868.

In 1871, an international Rinderpest convention was held in Vienna. It was purposed to establish mechanisms for reporting outbreaks to warn neighbouring countries, and so as to establish policies for inspections, quarantines, and disinfections, as well as monitoring the cattle trade.

In 1879, a notable cattle plague outbreak in Congress Poland and parts of Prussia resulted in the slaughter of animals. Impacted cities included Warsaw, Posen, and Sochaczew. Prussian authorities considered military border guards to hinder the spread of the disease.

==== Rinderpest in 19th-century Africa ====
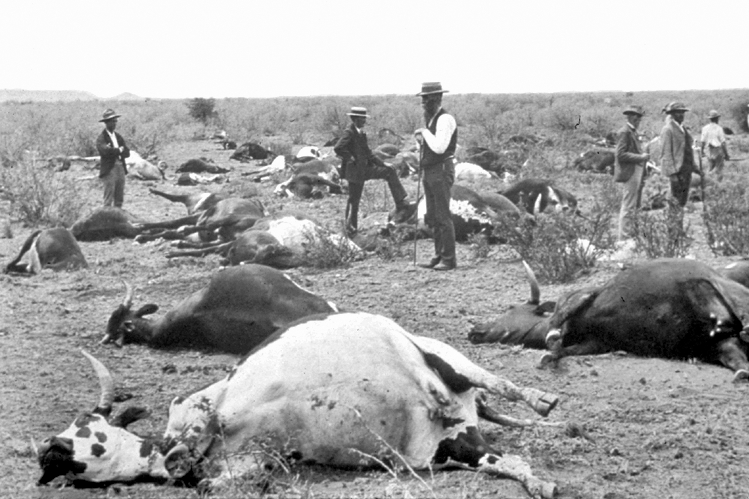
Cows dead from rinderpest in South Africa, 1896

Around the turn of the century, a plague struck in Southern Africa. Spinage establishes a critical commentary on the theory that in 1888, rinderpest was introduced into Abyssinia (modern Ethiopia) by the invading Italian army, which supposedly brought with them infected cattle from India. The procurement chain is not traced beyond an Egyptian businessman from Cairo, but the British Army possibly got their draft oxen from India. However, the documentary chain only supported limited negative conclusions; Spinage states that "[t]here is therefore no evidence in contemporary accounts that the rinderpest panzootic was imported from India with infected oxen to provision the Italian landing at Massawa". As a result, determining from where rinderpest in South Africa originated in the 19th century may be impossible – whether from invading Italians, invading Egyptians, or local breakouts in Eritrea. Once in progress, the infection eventually spread to the shores of Lake Victoria and into German Tanzania.

Sunseri concentrates on the detailed progress of the epizootic in German Tanzania, endeavouring to show that the disease was known to be present, but was not officially recognised as being rinderpest. He emphasises in particular the failure by the German government to rely on or accept a post mortem in 1892 professionally medically conducted on an affected animal that had been duly diagnosed as having rinderpest. The diagnosis was procured at the personal behest of the governor and remitted to Berlin. Awareness of a cattle plague in general apparently did not amount to the German government accepting that the plague was rinderpest, for which measures of a strict kind were prescribed in Germany itself. The governor, Julius von Soden, personally lost his own herd, and this may have led him to secure the post mortem so as to challenge the official diagnostic silence. The impact on African-owned herds was drastic.

The disease was locally described as sadoka, and it also affected local wildlife. Sunseri's thesis basically explains the German government's failure to recognise the true nature of the disease as permitting ineffective policies. The local German government was short of cash, without a veterinarian until the late 1890s and surrounded by innumerable serious cattle diseases apart from rinderpest. The 1885 protectorate status of Tanzania (ruled by the German East Africa Company) had been interrupted by coastal rebellion; when formal German rule began and the military went inland in 1891 to pacify areas, they encountered massive cattle deaths ostensibly due to viral spread from wildlife. Some observers themselves described the outbreak as rinderpest, whereas argument and debate continued because of essentially lack of consistent information and detailed investigation. When the German governor requested confirmation as to a course of action, he would have been fully aware of the administrative consequences, had matters been dealt with in Germany (quarantines, slaughter policies, disinfection controls of cattle transport, and control of products suspected of contact with contaminated animals).

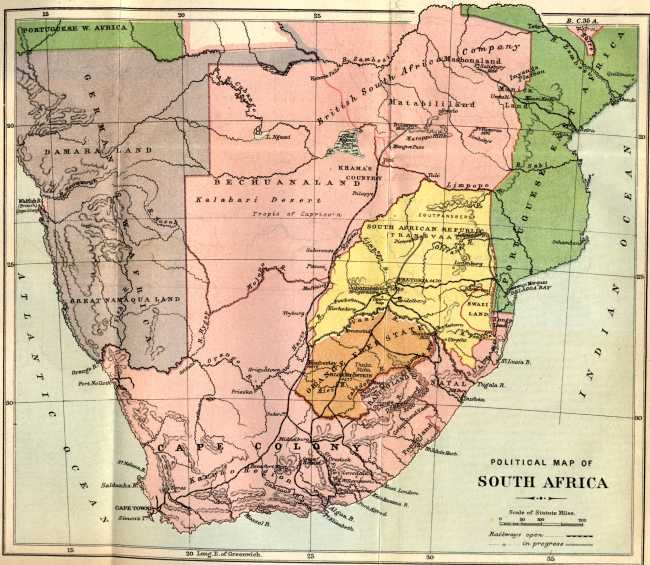
Political map of South Africa drawn 1897, reprinted 1899 from Impressions of South Africa by James Bryce

In the event, the post mortem was reviewed in Berlin and determined to be incomplete; a diagnosis could only be made on the ground by a veterinarian. Funding them was not a priority, as most of the cattle by then (1892) had died. Meanwhile, a German staff doctor with an interest in animal diseases opined (two long reports for the German Colonial Service) that the problem must be an Africa-specific matter, not the familiar rinderpest. His confusion may derive from the absence of impact of rinderpest on German wildlife. This is now explained by the fenced and manicured German agricultural landscape of the day being insufficiently "wild" and livestock normally being kept apart.

By 1893, government regulatory response was as though the disease had been rinderpest in Germany (and included preventive slaughter). Cattle exports were banned in 1893 (to improve local stocks, not on grounds of confining spread, as some cattle were exempt). Nevertheless importation, legal or illegal or rebranded via Zanzibar, reached the British colonies in the south.

Marquardt concentrates on the detailed progress of the disease in South Africa during the 1896 outbreak. Between 1896 and 1897, 95% of the cattle in South Africa were killed by the disease. The primary spreading agency seems to be the common use of waterholes by wild ungulates and herded cattle. The herded cattle were normally in transit and the long incubation period and delayed symptoms meant that spreading had taken place before illness was realised. His initial case study is Southern Bechuanaland settled as it then was by two distinct cattle-focused groups: the Tswana people and the Boers. It was flat, hot, and dry and was considered good cattle-raising country. Water was regularly available by drilling 20–30 feet (6.1–9.1 m) below the surface, though many farms had water only by drilling 50–100 feet (15–30 m) down. From 1882 onwards, designated Tswana reserves were created adjoining white farms in many instances. African pastoralism was constrained by this.

From 1895, increasing numbers of white settlers (now administered from the Cape) evicted the Tswana, and tension between these groups was inevitable. The 1896 drought resulted in fewer watering places being available, and a greater density of usage, including both groups of cattle-owners and the wild animals. By May 1896, the vast Clober farm had become a focus of infection with immediate slaughter policies in place. Three river drinking places, mainly used by the Tswana group, recorded over 12,000 head of cattle regularly each; the government was reluctant to embark on wholesale destruction. The government tried, and failed, to stop herds crossing rivers and perpetuating stock-mingling. The spread of the disease was relentless in the Bechuanaland Protectorate.

The connection between rinderpest and starvation was recognised by the British government as cause for urgent intervention by delivery of food relief. In 1896, 30,000 tons of mealies (corn) were delivered for the relief of the Bechuanaland Protectorate. Meanwhile, the Crocodile River in the Transvaal was reported as choked with cattle and other animal corpses, but remained in use. During the dry season, the government made no attempt to control use of the watering holes, fearing the consequences if they did. The Boers essentially did no better, mainly because they continued to migrate their cattle between parcels of land rather than remaining stationery within a particular parcel.

Complaint by both Boer and Tswana groups was focused on the government rather than mutual hostility. Fencing, and quarantining coupled with killing of infected cattle, was a policy barely controllable in the expanses of the colony, though it had some success in England. However, fencing resulted in herd-mingling and consequent infection. The Tswana herds were quarantined together; the Boer herds were also quarantined, but on their own land. The system was very unpopular, and the policy was scorned and pilloried in the press; plenty of reports came out to the effect that the disease was spread by the quarantine guards and by the veterinarians, all of whom were less than careful about disinfecting themselves.

The major spreader of disease plausibly could have been negligent government officials or contractors moving directly from areas known to be diseased to other areas in protective quarantine. In Southern Bechuanaland alone, over 400 men were hired as quarantine guards. Owners from both groups resisted the guards, and the Boers vigorously resisted the killing of their cattle. Both groups likely raised the fences, and several Boer groups deliberately spread the disease to claim the compensation. By 1896, the government campaign was generally recognised as having completely failed, overwhelmed by a storm of contributory causes to the spread of the disease.

The outbreak in the 1890s killed an estimated 80–90% of all cattle in eastern and southern Africa. Sir Arnold Theiler was instrumental in developing a vaccine that curbed the epizootic. The consequences for the Africans were especially severe. Though cattle numbers revived subsequently, the consequent human toll was mass starvation in the absence of herding, hunting, and farming. The human losses were estimated to be as high as one-third of the population of Ethiopia and two-thirds of the Maasai people of Tanzania. This famine caused significant depopulation in sub-Saharan Africa, allowing thornbush to colonise. This formed ideal habitat for tsetse fly, which carries sleeping sickness and is unsuitable for livestock; "hence the European view of an empty unspoiled Africa teeming with game".

==== Rinderpest in 19th-century Asia ====
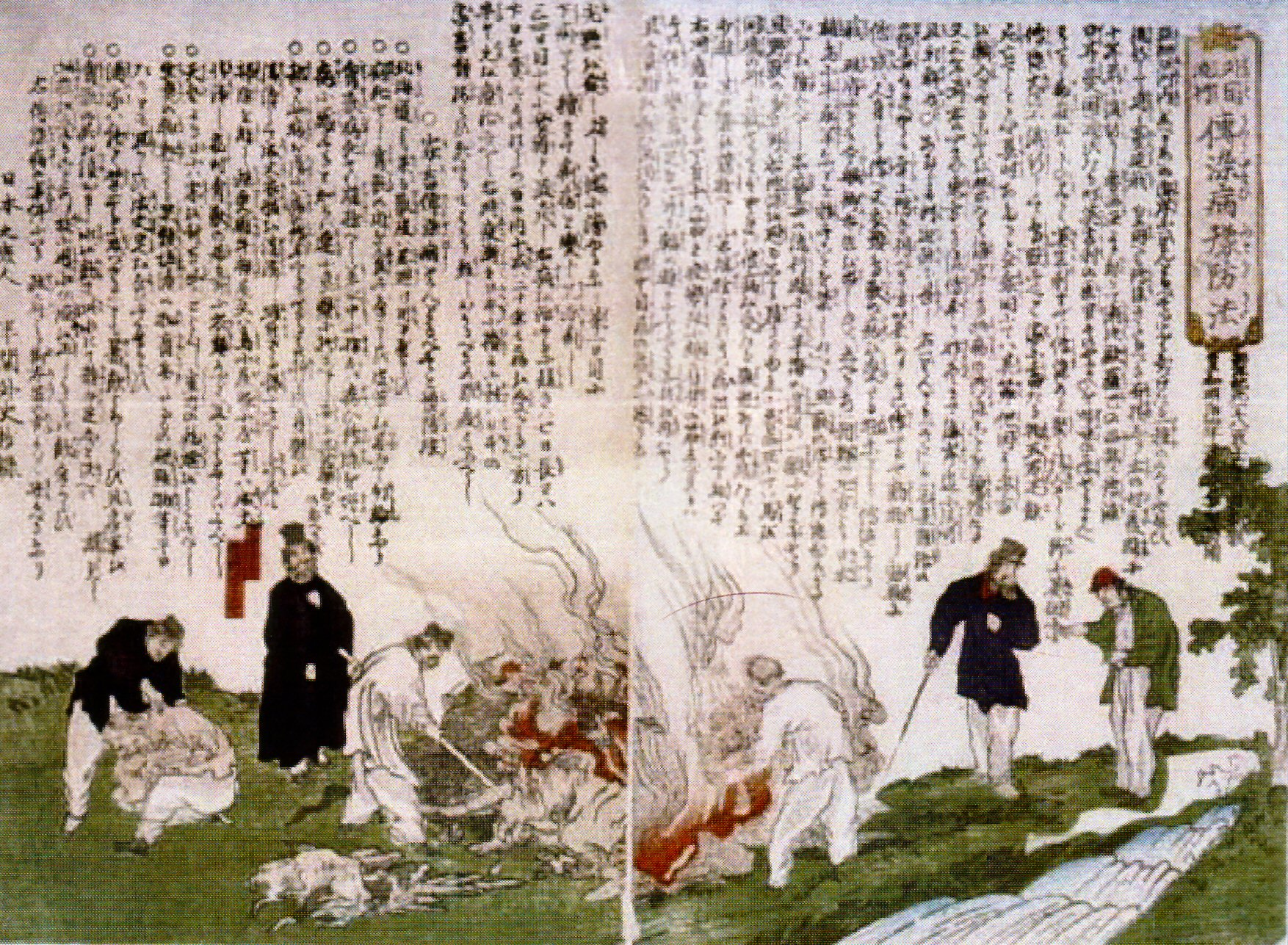
Japanese 19th century print recording disposal of rinderpest-infected cattle (anonymous)

Japan also sustained the presence of rinderpest in the 19th century as illustrated in an anonymous print. The disease was present for centuries in China, Japan, and Korea. Japanese black and Korean yellow breed cattle were known to be especially susceptible to it.

In 1868, a serious outbreak of rinderpest occurred in India, which was investigated by Colonel James Hallen of the Indian Cattle Plague Commission, leading to the publication of his survey in 1871. The Imperial Bacteriological Laboratory from 1893 was at Mukteshwar in India. It hosted much research work and many samples. Its founding director was British pathologist Alfred Lingard.

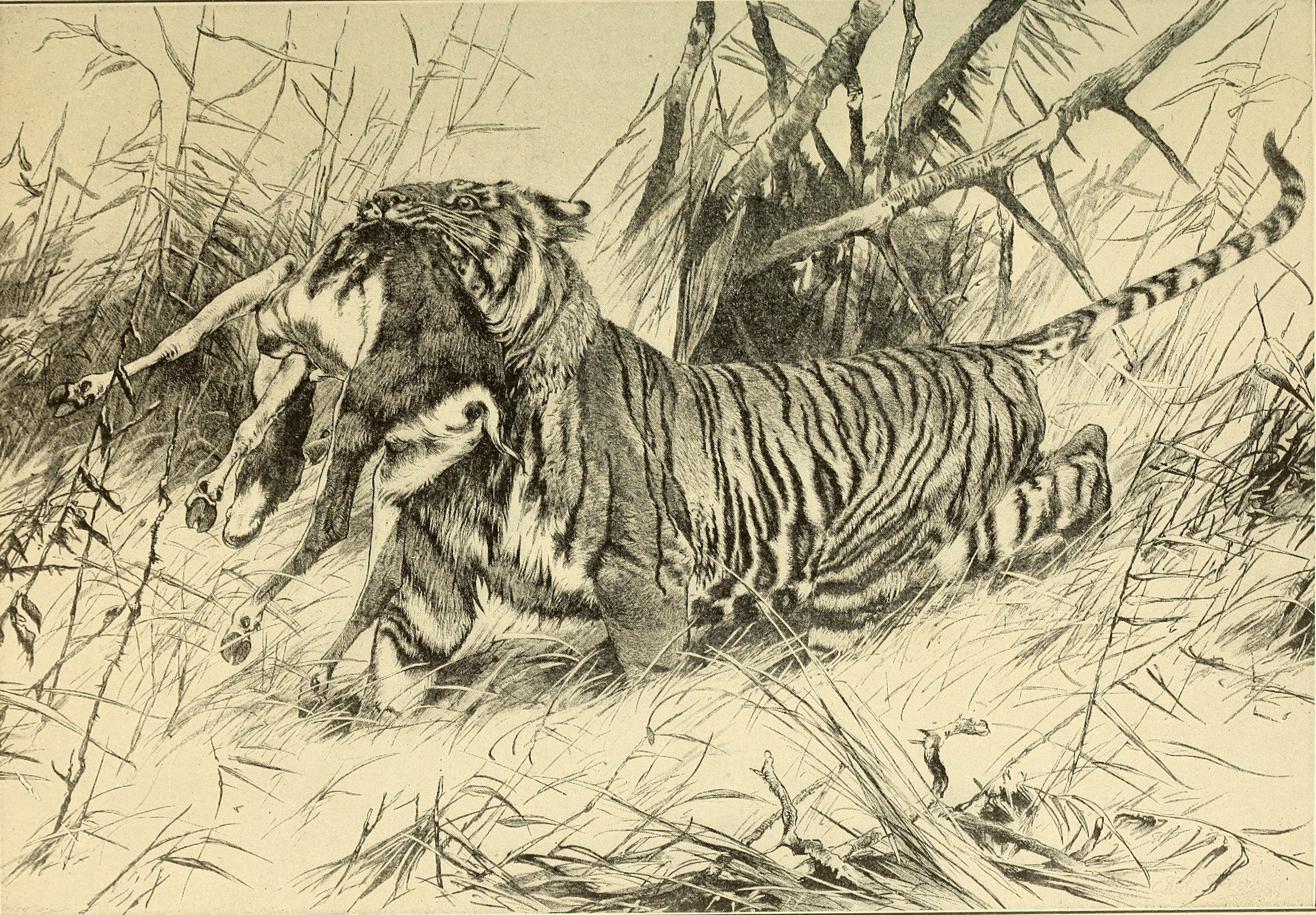
A tiger seizes its prey (Illustration, 1901, from Animals in Action: Studies and Stories of Beasts, Birds and Reptiles...)

In India, some farmers were reported as not hostile to tigers because of the consideration that their attacks on diseased or weaker animals reduced the risk of rinderpest.

=== 20th century ===
In his classic study of the Nuer of southern Sudan, E. E. Evans-Pritchard suggested rinderpest might have affected the Nuer's social organization before and during the 1930s. Since the Nuer were pastoralists, much of their livelihood was based on cattle husbandry, and bride prices were paid in cattle; prices may have changed as a result of cattle depletion. Rinderpest might also have increased dependence on horticulture among the Nuer.

Rinderpest was eradicated from Japan in 1922, as recorded by the Nippon Institute for Biological Science. Distinguished Japanese scientist and director of the Nippon Institute for Biological Science, Junji Nakamura (1903–1975), was a major researcher into rinderpest, and the contribution of his work to the worldwide eradication of rinderpest was acknowledged by the Food and Agriculture Organisation of the United Nations. The FAO posthumously presented a certificate of appreciation in 2011.

A more recent rinderpest outbreak in Africa in 1982–1984 resulted in an estimated US$2 billion in stock losses.

=== Vaccination ===
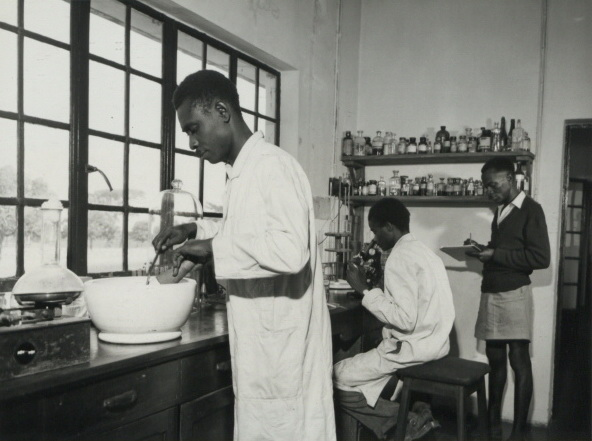
Mr. G. W. F. Mahoney, Veterinary Laboratory Superintendent at Abuko, June 1959

In 1917–18, William Hutchins Boynton (1881–1959), the chief veterinary pathologist with the Philippine Bureau of Agriculture, developed an early vaccine for rinderpest, based on treated animal organ extracts.

In 1959, rinderpest vaccine was prepared at government laboratories in Abuko in The Gambia from the spleen of infected cattle.

Walter Plowright worked on an attenuated vaccine for the RBOK strain of the rinderpest virus from 1956 to 1962. Plowright was awarded the World Food Prize in 1999 for developing a vaccine against a strain of rinderpest. In 1999, the FAO predicted that with vaccination, rinderpest would be eradicated by 2010.

== Eradication ==
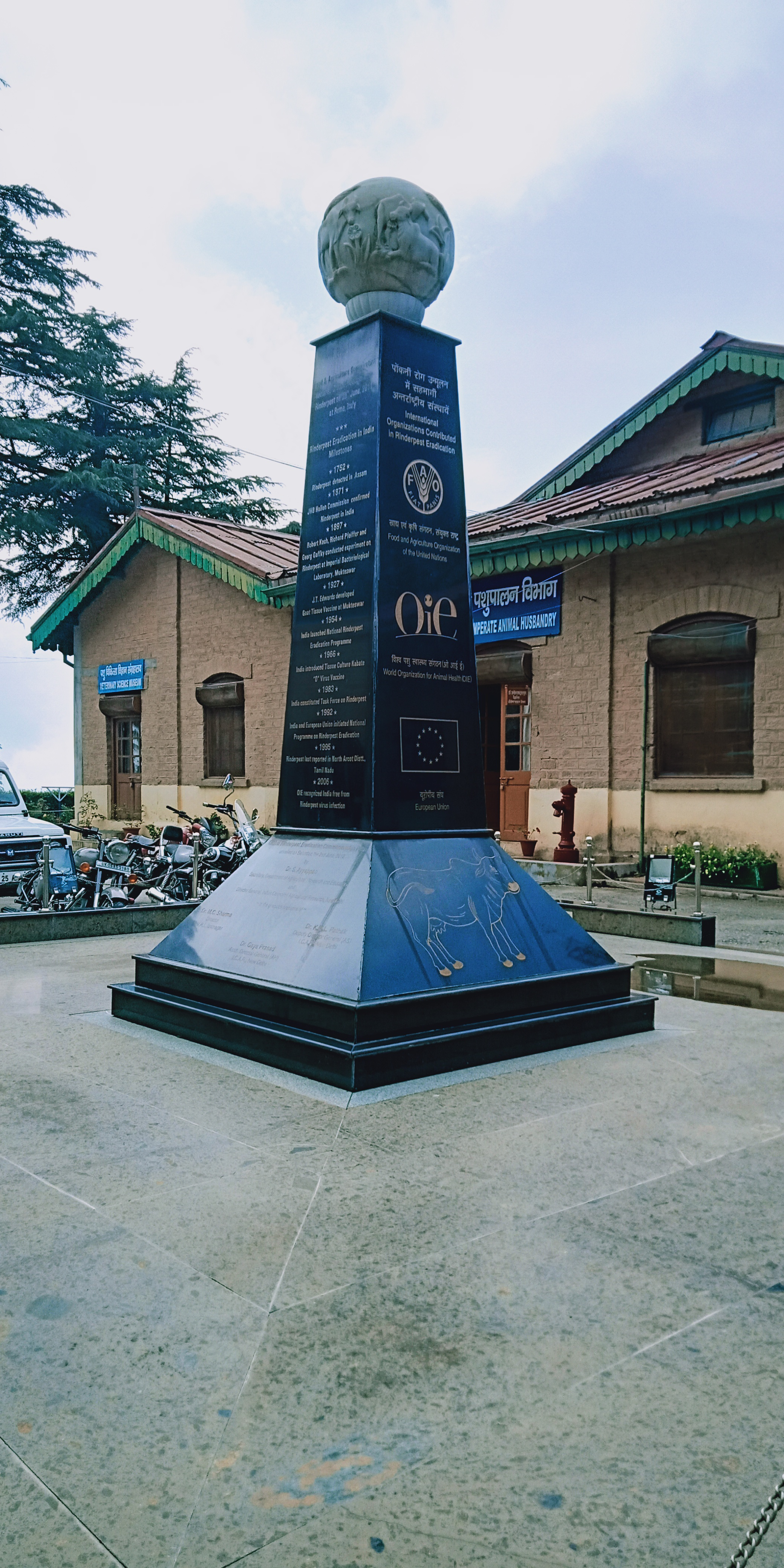
Rinderpest memorial Mukteshwar (2019) by Shyamal

Widespread eradication efforts began in the early 20th century, although until the 1950s, they mostly took place on an individual country basis, using vaccination campaigns. In 1924, the World Organisation for Animal Health (OIE) was formed in response to rinderpest. In 1950, the Inter-African Bureau of Epizootic Diseases was formed, with the stated goal of eliminating rinderpest from Africa. With the loss of its wildebeest population, the Serengeti experienced radical fire regime shift to intense annual wildfires. During the 1960s, a program called JP 15 attempted to vaccinate all cattle in participating countries and, by 1979, only one of the countries involved, Sudan, reported cases of rinderpest. In the decades since, the wildebeest have returned to the Serengeti and tree cover has returned with them.

In 1969, an outbreak of the disease originated in Afghanistan, travelling westwards and promoting a mass vaccination plan, which by 1972, had eliminated rinderpest in all areas of Asia except for Lebanon and India; both countries were the site of further occurrences of the disease in the 1980s.

During the 1980s, however, an outbreak of rinderpest from Sudan spread throughout Africa, killing millions of cattle, as well as wildlife. In response, the Pan-African Rinderpest Campaign was initiated in 1987, using vaccination and surveillance to combat the disease. By the 1990s, nearly all of Africa, with the exception of parts of Sudan and Somalia, was declared free of rinderpest.

Worldwide, the Global Rinderpest Eradication Programme was initiated in 1994, supported by the Food and Agriculture Organization, the OIE, and the International Atomic Energy Agency. This program was successful in reducing rinderpest outbreaks to few and far between by the late 1990s. The program is estimated to have saved affected farmers about 58 million net euros.

By 2000, only the Horn of Africa and Pakistan appeared to have a continued presence. Mariner et al., 2000 introduced participatory disease surveillance to rinderpest efforts. The last confirmed case of rinderpest was reported in Kenya in 2001. Since then, while no cases have been confirmed, the disease is believed to have been present in parts of Somalia past that date. The final vaccinations were administered in 2006, and the last surveillance operations took place in 2009, failing to find any evidence of the disease.

The Mariner method continued to be used in those two locations (the Horn and Pakistan) to track down possible lingering refugia in the coming years. In 2008, scientists involved in rinderpest eradication efforts believed a good chance existed that rinderpest would join smallpox as officially "wiped off the face of the planet". The FAO, which had been co-ordinating the global eradication program for the disease, announced in November 2009 that it expected the disease to be eradicated within 18 months.

In October 2010, the FAO announced it was confident the disease has been eradicated. The agency said that "[a]s of mid 2010, FAO is confident that the rinderpest virus has been eliminated from Europe, Asia, Middle East, Arabian Peninsula, and Africa," which were the locations where the virus had been last reported. Eradication was confirmed by the OIE on 25 May 2011.

On 28 June 2011, FAO and its members countries officially recognized global freedom from the deadly cattle virus. On this day, the FAO Conference, the highest body of the UN agency, adopted a resolution declaring the eradication of rinderpest. The resolution also called on the world community to follow up by ensuring that samples of rinderpest viruses and vaccines be kept under safe laboratory conditions and that rigorous standards for disease surveillance and reporting be applied. "While we are celebrating one of the greatest successes for FAO and its partners, I wish to remind you that this extraordinary achievement would not have been possible without the joint efforts and strong commitments of governments, the main organizations in Africa, Asia, and Europe, and without the continuous support of donors and international institutions", FAO Director-General Jacques Diouf commented.

The rinderpest eradication effort is estimated to have cost US$5 billion.

Stocks of the rinderpest virus are still maintained by highly specialized laboratories. In 2015, FAO launched a campaign calling for the destruction or sequestering of the remaining stocks of rinderpest virus in laboratories in 24 countries, citing risks of inadvertent or malicious release.

On 14 June 2019, the largest stock of the rinderpest virus was destroyed at the Pirbright Institute.

== Use as a biological weapon ==
Rinderpest was one of more than a dozen agents the United States government researched as potential biological weapons before terminating its biological weapons program.

Rinderpest is of concern as a biological weapon for these reasons:

- The disease has high rates of morbidity and mortality.
- It is highly communicable and spreads rapidly once introduced into nonimmune herds.
- Cattle herds are no longer immunized against RPV, so are susceptible to infection.

Rinderpest was also considered as a biological weapon in a United Kingdom government programme during World War II.

== See also ==
- Murrain
- Ovine rinderpest
- Rift Valley fever
- Smallpox

== General and cited references ==
- Spinage, Clive A. (2003). Cattle Plague: A History. New York: Springer. ISBN 978-0-306-47789-8. OCLC 52178719.
